= Usenet personality =

Internet celebrity notable for Usenet posting

A Usenet personality was a particular kind of internet personality who gained a certain level of notoriety from posting on the Usenet discussion forum. Since its inception, Usenet newsgroups have attracted a wide variety of users. Some posters achieved a certain amount of fame and celebrity within Usenet circles because of their unusual or humorous writings.

== Eccentric personalities ==
These individuals (or user-IDs, or pseudonyms) are noted for their eccentric beliefs and theories.

- Alexander Abian (1923–1999) – American mathematician who taught for many years at Iowa State University and became an Internet legend for his incessant and frequently bizarre posts to various Usenet newsgroups. In particular, he gained international notoriety for his claims that blowing up the Moon would eliminate virtually all natural disasters, and that mass and time are equivalent. (With regard to the second claim, it was suggested on the sci.astro.amateur newsgroup that his demise be observed with a gram of silence.) Another of Dr. Abian's hypotheses was the challenge to the Big Bang Theory with the Big Suck Theory. Despite his eccentric views, Abian (who in 1965 authored The theory of sets and transfinite arithmetic) often contributed productively and settled debates on sci.math.
- Robert E. McElwaine (1948?–2008) – self-described Bachelor of Science in physics who wrote a series of ranting fringe science essays characteristically peppered with capitalized words for emphasis. Each essay covered topics such as alien influence on violence, free energy, coming UFO landings, and cancer cures, often carrying a message that there existed a conspiracy to suppress the information. The essays often concluded with the signature "UN-altered REPRODUCTION and DISSEMINATION of this IMPORTANT Information is ENCOURAGED, ESPECIALLY to COMPUTER BULLETIN BOARDS." McElwaine's writings stopped appearing on Usenet after 1998, although he continued writing essays up to 2003. He died at age 59 in his home in Eau Claire, Wisconsin, on 12 February 2008.
- Archimedes Plutonium (current legal name, born Ludwig Poehlmann in 1950, raised as Ludwig Hansen, also known as Ludwig van Ludvig and Ludwig Plutonium) – noted for his many posts about his own theories of physics, mathematics, and stock market investing, and in particular his "Plutonium Atom Totality" theory, which posits that the universe is a giant plutonium atom and that galaxies are "dots" in the electron dot cloud of this atom.
- MI5Victim (Mike Corley, a.k.a. Boleslaw Tadeusz Szocik) – paranoid user who goes through periods of binge posting, claiming that MI5, part of the United Kingdom Military Intelligence service, has bugged his home and is sending people to follow him around and harass him. These allegations are often crossposted to newsgroups where his messages would be considered off-topic. Since 1995, he has posted transcripts and snippets of conversations that he has recorded. He has claimed in his posts that television personalities are often talking about him in code and are part of the MI5 conspiracy. Corley often cross-posted "examples" of MI5 victimizing him 20 or 30 posts at a time. He has been banned from posting through Google for his abuse of Usenet, and has been similarly removed from most ISPs in England, an assertion which Corley rebutted in August 2012. In 2007, the opera The Corley Conspiracy, by Tim Benjamin and Sean Starke, premiered at the Southbank Centre in London. Corley has his own web site on which he provides so-called evidence of the conspiracies against him. Corley has written a book about his "experiences" with MI5.
- Jack Sarfatti – American author of a number of non-scientific works on quantum physics and consciousness, known for his iconoclastic ideas concerning the schism between science and the humanities, as well as space migration, intelligence increase, life extension, UFOs, extraterrestrials, time travel, and psychokinesis.
- Nancy Lieder was a woman from Wisconsin who claims that as a girl she was visited by extraterrestrials from Zeta Reticuli who implanted a communications device in her brain. In 1995, she founded the website ZetaTalk to distribute her ideas. She came to public attention on Internet newsgroups during the buildup to Comet Hale–Bopp's perihelion in 1997. She claimed Hale-Bopp was not a comet but a fraud to keep people distracted until "Planet X" would pass near the Earth and destroy civilization on 27 May 2003. That date passed without incident, and then Lieder claimed she had said a "white lie to fool the establishment". Lieder has refused to give any other date when she thinks "Planet X" will pass near the Earth.

== Criminal and eccentric personalities ==
These individuals (or user-IDs, or pseudonyms) are noted for their criminal, eccentric, paranoid, or threatening behavior, or newsgroup trolling activities.

- Scott Abraham – skiing enthusiast banned by court order in 1999 from posting on the Usenet discussion group rec.skiing.alpine, after engaging in a flame war with other online posters. The heated exchanges lasted for months, eventually escalating into death threats, until a police detective from Seattle posted a request for all involved to calm down. All involved did except Abraham, which ultimately led to a court order being filed against him. The Electronic Frontier Foundation and other civil liberties groups commented that this violated free speech protection, but did not deny that Abraham's aggressive behavior exceeded the boundaries of normal newsgroup civility.
- Serdar Argic – alias used in one of the first automated newsgroup spam incidents on Usenet, with the objective of denying the Armenian genocide. It was an automated bot that made thousands of posts to several newsgroups (especially soc.history, soc.culture.turkish, and misc.headlines) in 1994. The deluge of posts suddenly disappeared in April 1994, after Stefan Chakerian created a specific newsgroup (alt.cancel.bots) to carry only cancel messages specifically for any post from any machine downstream from the UUNET feed which carried Serdar Argic's messages.
- David D'Amato – former assistant principal and director of guidance at West Hempstead High School, he actively spammed and trolled a variety of newsgroups (particularly alt.gothic and rec.music.phish) from roughly 1996 to 1999, initiated e-mail bombings against those he considered "opponents", and solicited for video recordings of young adult males being bound and tickled, all while using the pseudonym/alter ego Terri DiSisto, who was supposedly a female college student. D'Amato was found guilty of e-mail bombings which caused service outages at a number of colleges and universities, was fined US$5,000, and spent six months in federal prison after being convicted in 2001. He is a subject of the 2016 documentary Tickled. He died in March 2017.
- Valery Fabrikant – former associate professor of mechanical engineering at Concordia University in Montreal; he shot and killed four colleagues in the school massacre referred to as the Concordia University massacre. Fabrikant has posted in several newsgroups, particularly sci.research.careers, can.general and can.politics, claiming that he is the innocent victim of a conspiracy against him. These posts can be found at an archive of his home page.
- Hipcrime – called "a leading Usenet terrorist", this user wrote and distributed software applications that allow users to modify or cancel newsgroup posts, and to generate large volumes of email spam. These have been classified as denial of service (DoS) and spamming programs. The pseudonym is derived from a neologism appearing in the science fiction novel Stand on Zanzibar by John Brunner. Hipcrime has never been positively identified and thus it is unknown if it is the work of a single person or a group.

== Unusual personalities ==
These are individuals (or user-IDs) that are unusual for reasons other than being eccentric.

- B1FF (or BIFF) – well-known pseudonym and prototypical newbie on Usenet. Posts usually consisted of uppercase text containing many bangs ("!"), typos, "cute" misspellings, the use (and often misuse) of fragments of chat abbreviations, a long signature block, sometimes a doubled signature, and exaggerated naïveté. The BIFF pseudonym was originally created by Joe Talmadge, also the author of the infamous and much-copied Flamer's Bible. Talmadge posted twice as BIFF and after that Richard Sexton posted as BIFF a few dozen times over the next year or two.
- Joel K. "Jay" Furr – Usenet poster in the early 1990s immortalized in the newsgroups alt.fan.joel-furr, alt.bonehead.joel-furr, and alt.joel-furr.die.die.die. He was a pretender to the throne of James "Kibo" Parry, and the bitter enemy of Serdar Argic. Furr was also notable on Usenet for his self-appointed leadership over the alt hierarchy during the commercial expansion of the Internet (ca. 1993–1995), during which he attempted to bring some order and rationale to rampant newsgroup creation, but with minimal success. According to Brad Templeton, Furr is one of the earliest people to refer to unsolicited electronic messages as "spam".
- Gharlane of Eddore (1947–2001) – pseudonym of David G. Potter, a science fiction writer and critic in Sacramento, California, who was widely known for acerbic, scathingly humorous and knowledgeable postings to Usenet science fiction newsgroups. He guarded his true identity carefully for many years before his death in 2001. His chief surviving non-fictional work is the Lensman FAQ and voluminous Usenet postings.
- The Internet Oracle (a.k.a. The Usenet Oracle) – collective effort at humor in a question-and-answer format, wherein a user sends a question to the Oracle via e-mail or the Internet Oracle website, which is then randomly sent to another user who has asked a previous question. This second user may then answer the question. Meanwhile, the original questioner is also sent a question which he may choose to answer. All exchanges are conducted through a central distribution system which also makes all users anonymous. A completed question-and-answer pair is called an "oracularity". Many exchanges make allusions to Zen koans, witty wordplay, and computer geek humor, as well as in-jokes.
- Kibo – pseudonym of James Parry, who provided the basis for the formation of an entire newsgroup, alt.religion.kibology. Kibo was known for his high-volume but thoughtful posts, but achieved Usenet celebrity circa 1991 by writing a small script to grep his entire Usenet feed for instances of his name, and then answering personally whenever and wherever he was mentioned, giving the illusion that he was personally reading the entire feed.
- Mark V Shaney – pseudonym of an automated program that used Markov chain logic to recombine the text of posts into nearly coherent posts.
- Publius – anonymous poster who, from 1994 to 1995, used the Penet remailer service to deliver cryptic messages to alt.music.pink-floyd. These posts revealed that an enigma had been hidden within Pink Floyd's The Division Bell, and Publius called upon fans to find the solution. Although the remailer service was shut down in 1995 and Publius has not been heard from since, the puzzle and the prize for solving it were acknowledged by Pink Floyd's drummer, Nick Mason, at a book signing in 2005. The Publius Enigma has never been officially solved.

== Other personalities ==
These people are known for their status within their respective Usenet communities.

- John C. Baez – mathematical physicist at the University of California, Riverside, known to science fans as the author of This Week's Finds in Mathematical Physics, an irregular column on the web featuring mathematical exposition and criticism, which he started in 1993 for the Usenet community and which now has a worldwide following. Baez is also known on the World Wide Web as the author of the crackpot index, a humorous numerical method for rating scientific claims and the individuals that make them.
- Torkel Franzén (1950–2006) – Swedish academic who worked at Luleå University of Technology, Sweden, in the fields of mathematical logic and computer science. He was known for his work on Gödel's incompleteness theorems and for his contributions to Usenet.
- Tilman Hausherr – German poster who is well known among critics of Scientology for his frequent Usenet posts and for maintaining a website critical of Scientology. He is also credited with coining the term sporgery.
- James Nicoll – science-fiction reviewer and retired game-store owner. As a Usenet personality, Nicoll is known for writing a widely quoted epigram on the English language, as well as for his contributions of concepts like the Nicoll-Dyson Laser and the "brain eater" to Usenet groups like rec.arts.sf.written and rec.arts.sf.fandom; and for his accounts of suffering a high number of accidents (known collectively as "Nicoll Events") recounted in these groups.
- Brad Templeton – software architect, civil rights advocate and entrepreneur. An early luminary of Usenet, Templeton founded ClariNet Communications Corporation and created the newsgroup rec.humor.funny in 1987 and moderated it from 1987 to 1992.
- Erik Naggum (1965–2009) – a Norwegian computer programmer recognized for his work in the fields of SGML, Emacs and Lisp. Since the early 1990s, he was also a highly active and provocative participant on various Usenet discussion groups.

== See also ==
- Backbone cabal
- Crank
- List of Internet phenomena
