= Cenon (disambiguation) =

Cenon is a commune in Nouvelle-Aquitaine, France.

Cenon may also refer to:

== Places ==
- Canton of Cenon, an administrative division of the Gironde department, southwestern France
- Cenon Gallicanon, town of ancient Bithynia
- Cenon-sur-Vienne, a commune in the Vienne Department in Nouvelle-Aquitaine, France

== People ==
- Zenón de Somodevilla, 1st Marquess of Ensenada a.k.a. Cenon de Somodevilla (1702−1781), 18th century Spanish statesman
- Ryza Cenon (born 1987), Filipina actress

== See also ==
- Senon, a commune in north-eastern France
- Tenon (disambiguation)
- Zenon (disambiguation)
- Zenone (disambiguation)
