= Zeno (surname) =

Zeno is a surname. Notable people with the surname include:

- Ana María Zeno (1922–2011), Argentine professor and gynaecologist
- Antonio Zeno (1326–1402), Venetian navigator
- Antonio Zeno (bishop) (died 1530), Italian Roman Catholic bishop
- Apostolo Zeno (1669–1750), Italian poet
- Carlo Zeno (1333–1418), Venetian admiral
- Giovanni Battista Zeno (1440–1501), Venetian cardinal
- Jacob Zeno, American football player
- Joseph Zenon (1900–1968), American musician
- Lee Allen Zeno (1954–2026), American bassist
- Marco Zeno (1585–1641), Italian Roman Catholic bishop
- Mohamed Al Zeno (born 1983), Syrian footballer
- Muhammad bin Jamil Zeno (1922–2010), Syrian islamicist
- Nicolò Zeno (fl. 1558), Venetian cartographer
- Nicolò Zeno (died 1403), Venetian navigator
- Pietro Zeno (died 1427), Venetian lord of Andros and Syros
- Reniero Zeno (fl. 1240–1268), Doge of Venice
- Thierry Zéno (1950–2017), Belgian filmmaker
- Tony Zeno (born 1957), American basketball player

== See also ==
- Zeno (disambiguation)
- Zeno (name)
- Zeni (surname)
