= Xenos =

Xenos may refer to:

- Xenos (Greek), a Greek word meaning "stranger" or "alien"
- Xenos (insect), a genus of insects in the order Strepsiptera
- Xenos (graphics chip), a custom graphics processing unit (GPU) designed by ATI, used in the Xbox 360 video game console

== Entertainment ==
- Xenos (band), an Australian Romani music ensemble
- Xenos, term for extraterrestrial alien species or races in the setting of the Warhammer 40,000 wargame and related spin-offs
- Xenos, a book in the Eisenhorn trilogy by Dan Abnett set in the Warhammer 40,000 universe
- Xenos, a TRS-80 game
- Xenos, the name of the intelligent monsters in Is It Wrong to Try to Pick Up Girls in a Dungeon? (season 3)
- "XENOS", a 2016 song by Blank Banshee from MEGA

== Other ==
- Xenos (store), a chain of goods stores in Germany and The Netherlands, owned by Blokker Holding
- Xenos Program, a program created by the German Federal Government
- Xenos Christian Fellowship, a non-denominational church in Columbus, Ohio
- Spiros Xenos (1881–1963), Greek-born Swedish artist
- Sonex Aircraft Xenos, a motorglider
- Xenos Group, a division of Actuate Corporation - now OpenText
- PGFG Xenos, a La Combattante IIIb-class fast attack craft ship of the Hellenic Navy

== See also ==
- Xen, a virtual machine monitor software
- Zenos, a prophet mentioned in the Book of Mormon
- Xeno (disambiguation)
- Zeno (disambiguation)
- Xenon (disambiguation)
