= Xeni =

Xeni can refer to:

- Xeni Gwet'in, Canadian First Nations people
- Xeni Gwet'in First Nation, their government
- Xeni Jardin, American journalist
- Xeni, character from the TV Series Dream Productions

== See also ==
- Zeni (disambiguation)
