= Joel Furr =

American usenet personality (born 1967)

- Furr at ROFLCon in 2010
- Born: Joel K. Furr; 1967 (age 58–59); Roanoke, Virginia, U.S.
- Education: University of Georgia
- Occupations: Writer; software trainer

Joel K. "Jay" Furr (born 1967 in Roanoke, Virginia) is an American writer and software trainer, notable as a Usenet personality in the early and mid-1990s.

According to Brad Templeton, Furr is one of the earliest people to refer to unsolicited electronic messages as "spam". The term "spam" had been widely used by Monty Python fans to describe excessive torrents of verbiage on electronic chat systems and multi-user dungeons, analogous to the Vikings chanting "Spam, Spam, Spam, Spam… Lovely Spam! Wonderful Spam!" in the famous Python sketch. Furr used the term in the Usenet newsgroup news.admin.policy to describe an out-of-control automated robo-moderation system known as ARMM. While he didn't coin the phrase, he appears to have been the first to use it to describe the phenomenon as it applied to USENET newsgroups.

Furr created a line of Usenet kook T-shirts, which included a "Serdar Argic World Tour" shirt as well as one imprinted with the programming code for RSA encryption, boasting "This shirt is a munition", a reference to US export law.

He is an alumnus of the University of Georgia and its Demosthenian Literary Society.

Furr serves as the official "Weigher of Coal" for Richmond, Vermont. Furr appeared in the editorial pages of the Washington Post on May 11, 2018, with an editorial noting that despite having no official duties whatsoever as Weigher of Coal, he is still required to follow strict ethical standards.
