= Zeno =

Zeno may refer to:

== People ==
- Zeno (name), including a list of people and characters with the given name
- Zeno (surname)

=== Philosophers ===
- Zeno of Elea (c. 490 – c. 430 BCE), philosopher, follower of Parmenides, known for his paradoxes
- Zeno of Citium (333 – 264 BCE), founder of the Stoic school of philosophy
- Zeno of Tarsus (3rd century BCE), Stoic philosopher
- Zeno of Sidon (1st century BCE), Epicurean philosopher
- Zeno of Rhodes (not later than 220 BCE), historian and politician.

=== Other persons of antiquity ===
- Zeno of Caunus (3rd century BCE), finance minister to the Ptolemies, whose papyri letters (the "Zenon archive") were discovered in the 20th century
- Zeno (physician) (3rd and 2nd centuries BCE), Greek physician
- Zeno of Cyprus (4th century), Greek physician
- Zeno of Gaza (died c. 362 CE), early Christian martyr
- Zeno of Verona (4th century CE), saint commemorated in the place name Basilica of San Zeno, Verona, Italy
- Zeno the Hermit (4th century?) disciple of St. Basil and saint
- Zeno (consul 448) (447–451 CE), Roman general and consul
- Zeno (emperor) (c. 425 – 491 CE), Roman Emperor
- Zeno (Bishop of Mérida) (5th century CE), Greek Bishop of Mérida, Extremadura

== Arts, entertainment, and media ==
- Grand Zeno, a deity in the Dragon Ball media franchise
- Zeno (periodical), a German-language journal
- Zeno.org, a German digital library

== Other ==
- Ozone Zeno, a French paraglider design
- Zeno Mountain Farm, a non-profit, year round organization that hosts camps for people with and without disabilities
- Zeno, ancient name for the village of Akköse
- Zeno, Ohio, a community in the United States
- Zeno (crater), a lunar impact crater, named for Zeno of Citium
- Zeno-Watch Basel, a Swiss clockmaker company specialised in aviation watches

== See also ==
- Quantum Zeno effect, an effect in quantum mechanics which disallows certain conditions in the decaying of a quantum state
- San Zeno (disambiguation)
- Xeno (disambiguation)
- Xenon (disambiguation)
- Zenon (disambiguation)
- Zenone (disambiguation)
- Zeno machine, a hypothetical computational model
- Zeno's paradoxes, paradoxes by Zeno of Elea
- Zenonia zeno, an African butterfly
- Zenos, a book of Mormon scripture
