= Estland =

Estland may refer to:

- Estland, the modern name for Estonia in several languages
- Danish duchy of Estonia (Danish: Hertugdømmet Estland), a dominum directum of the King of Denmark from 1219 until 1346 in what is now Northern Estonia until it was sold and became:
  - A dominion of the Livonian Order within Terra Mariana in 1346–1561, until it was conquered by the Swedish Empire in the Livonian War and became:
    - The Swedish duchy of Estonia (Swedish: Hertigdömet Estland) in 1561–1721 until conquered by the Tsardom of Russia in the Great Northern War and became:
      - The Governorate of Estonia (Russian: Эстляндская губерния, romanized: Estlyandskaya guberniya) of the Russian Empire in 1721–1917
- An island in the Atlantic Ocean on the 1558 Venetian Zeno map, possibly corresponding to Shetland
