= San Zeno =

San Zeno is the Italian name of Zeno of Verona, an Italian Catholic saint.

It may also refer to:

== Places ==
=== Italy ===
- San Zeno di Montagna, a municipality in the province of Verona, Veneto
- San Zeno Naviglio, a municipality in the province of Brescia, Lombardy
- Sanzeno, a municipality in the province of Trento, Trentino-South Tyrol
- San Zeno (quarter), a quarter of Verona, Veneto
- San Zeno (Arezzo), a civil parish of Arezzo, Tuscany
- San Zeno (Cassola), a civil parish of Cassola (VI), Veneto

=== Colombia ===
- San Zenón, a municipality of the Department of Magdalena, Caribbean region

== Religious buildings ==
- Basilica of San Zeno, Verona, a church in Verona, Veneto
- San Zeno, Pisa, a church in Pisa, Tuscany
- Pistoia Cathedral (or Cathedral of San Zeno), a church in Pistoia, Tuscany

== See also ==
- Zeno (disambiguation)
- San Zenone (disambiguation)
- Zenon (disambiguation)
