= Meow Wars =

Early example of a flame war sent over Usenet

The Meow Wars were an early example of a flame war sent over Usenet which began in 1996 and ended circa 1998. Its participants were known as "Meowers". The war was characterized by posters from one newsgroup "crapflooding", or posting a large volume of nonsense messages, to swamp on-topic communication in other groups. Ultimately, the flame war affected many boards, with Roisin Kiberd writing in Motherboard, a division of Vice, that esoteric Internet vocabulary was created as a result of the Meow Wars.

== History ==
The wars began when some Harvard students, who had "colonized" an abandoned newsgroup for fans of Karl Malden, alt.fan.karl-malden.nose, and were using it as a community newsgroup for such posts about daily student life, jokingly suggested harassing members of the Beavis and Butthead fan group alt.tv.beavis-n-butthead, would be a good idea. One of the students — who was actually using a Boston University address, since he was an alumnus — announced the plan on Usenet on January 9, 1996.

The original "Meowers" were denizens of the Beavis and Butthead newsgroup, who responded to the "invasion" by adopting a "scorched earth" policy of rendering alt.fan.karl-malden.nose unusable. They began including the word "meow" in their posts in a reference to a karl-malden user with the initials CAT; the "meow" itself was a reference to Henrietta Pussycat, a character from Mr. Rogers' Neighborhood.

Once the Harvard students abandoned alt.fan.karl-malden.nose, it became the Meowers' base of operations for what they called their "Usenet Performance Art". The Harvard students retreated to a private news server. After taking over alt.fan.karl-malden.nose the Meowers decided to expand their campaign of operations, and spread throughout the alt.* hierarchy, to the so-called "Big 8" groups, and out to the wider Internet. The invasion and disruption of various groups lasted for over one year.

== Escalation ==
As the Meowers spilled over into more newsgroups, some experienced Usenetters placed the word "meow" and names of commonly seen Meowers into personal filters known as killfiles. This would often lead to the practice of "morphing," where some Meowers repeatedly altered their message headers and text so their messages would bypass those filters. Some users attempted to engage the Meowers with threats, complaints or insults. In response, the Meowers used tools like Deja News to find the favorite newsgroups of Usenet posters who criticized them and invade those as well.

The Meowers did not restrict their activities to Usenet. Since e-mail spam had not yet become a major problem, most Usenet posters generally still used their real email addresses when posting, and Meowers found it easy to flood mail accounts with thousands of nonsense messages, typically via anonymous remailers. The mail messages were often constructed so that they appeared to originate from other people. The mail systems at Boston University and other area colleges were rendered inoperable by one of these floods.

Another Meower, or at least a willing co-conspirator of the Meowers, was Grillo the Clown, who insisted that his epic-length cross-postings of obscene surrealist rants were not only performance art, but that they were protected by Grillo's right to free speech. Grillo also maintained that his gibberish was absolutely not off-topic to the subjects of the various newsgroups, and that his postings, however incomprehensible, were his heartfelt and valid statements regarding each of those topics.

In yet another series of incidents reported in news sources covering Usenet issues to be caused by Meowers (or, at least, to parties claiming to be such), floods of forged control messages (special posts used to create newsgroups, cancel individual usenet posts, and so on) caused the creation of hundreds of oddly-named newsgroups to appear at many locations. About this time, other Meower incidents included Fluffy the Cat—a parody of a Harvard student's pet and self-proclaimed owner of Usenet—proposed the creation of news.admin.cascade. The control flood prompted some Usenet users to adopt digital signatures to verify the authenticity of such messages.

== Countermeasures ==
Some Usenet posters added many of the Meower posters to their target lists, and demanded that Meowers' service providers disconnect them. The results of these measures were mixed, as not all servers accepted cancel messages and there were many servers (often inadvertently) open for posting if a Meower's regular access was terminated. Some Meowers also set up faked ISPs and used them to threaten those who filed abuse reports.

Stanley J. Kalisch III was one well-known "despammer" with the power to block posters from multiple Usenet servers. Kalisch declared a limited form of Usenet Death Penalty (UDP) when he became offended by what he termed "spammed cascades." He initially targeted several posting addresses, followed by the first-ever UDP of a specific person, Raoul Xemblinosky (also known as Bufford L. Hatchett and other names). Previously, UDP actions were reserved for servers.

Kalisch later declared UDPs on four other Meowers. Some Usenet posters criticized these bans, stating that the use of UDP violated a consensus that Usenet despammers should only UDP by originating server rather than by user. As Usenet aged, and the morphing of e-mail addresses and de facto handles evolved, Kalisch ran into technical obstacles in declaring UDPs against individuals.

Many Usenet administrators and users saw abuse of anonymous remailers and open news servers as a nuisance. In response to the activities of Meowers, some anonymous remailers were modified so that news posting was restricted, and many open servers were closed. These efforts would be redoubled later when spammers and other vandals began to mimic Meower tactics. The most notable of these vandals was HipCrime, who flooded many groups with senseless posts constructed using a steganography filter.

Another development that helped to curb Meower activity was server-side article filtering. Limitations could be placed on combinations of newsgroups, posting rates, and other article characteristics. Unlike cancels, server-side filtering only affects the servers on which it is installed.

== See also ==
- Newsgroup spam
