= Zichmni =

Zichmni is the name of an explorer-prince who appears in a 1558 book by Nicolò Zeno the younger of Venice, allegedly based on letters and a map (called the Zeno map) dating to the year 1400 by the author's ancestors, brothers Nicolò and Antonio Zeno. Zichmni is described as a great lord of some islands off the southern coast of Frislanda, a possibly fictitious island claimed to be larger than Ireland and located south of Iceland.

According to the book, the letters provide an account of adventures in the North Atlantic by the Zeno brothers in Zichmni's company, reaching Greenland, Iceland and various nonexistent islands including Frisland. The text also refers to an abortive attempt to find other islands further west including Estotiland. A few recent authors speculate that some of these islands may represent North America and that Zichmni in fact reached them, despite the text stating that he failed to do so. Scholarship since the 19th century has shown the Zeno letters and map are forgeries by the younger Nicolò Zeno.

Some proponents of the authenticity of the tale maintain that Zichmni was a Scottish nobleman named Henry Sinclair. However, other scholars have pointed to flaws in this identification and consider it extremely unlikely.

The first person to identify Zichmni with Henry Sinclair was Johann Reinhold Forster in 1784.

The account of the voyages given by the younger Nicolò continues to attract debate. Some of the islands the Zeno brothers allegedly visited either conflate existing locations or do not exist at all. Research has shown that the Zeno brothers were occupied elsewhere when they were supposedly doing their exploring. Contemporary Venetian court documents place Nicolò as undergoing trial for embezzlement in 1394 for his actions as military governor of Modone and Corone in Greece from 1390–1392. He wrote his last will and testament in Venice in 1400, many years after his alleged death in Frislanda around 1394. There is disagreement about the brothers' whereabouts at the time of the supposed voyages, with some readings of archival records placing the brothers in Venice at that time.

According to The Dictionary of Canadian Biography Online, "the Zeno affair remains one of the most preposterous and at the same time one of the most successful fabrications in the history of exploration." Herbert Wrigley Wilson described and analysed the story at length in The Royal Navy, a History from the Earliest Times to the Present, and was sceptical about its veracity, noting "At the date when the work was published Venice was extremely eager to claim for herself some share in the credit of Columbus's discoveries as against her old rival Genoa, from whom Columbus had sprung."

== Modern views ==
Most historians regard the map and accompanying narrative as a hoax, perpetrated by the younger Zeno to make a retroactive claim for Venice as having discovered the New World before Christopher Columbus.

The evidence against the authenticity of the map is based largely on the appearance of many phantom islands in the North Atlantic and off the coast of Iceland. One of these non-existent islands was Frisland, where the Zeno brothers allegedly spent some time.

== See also ==
- Henry Sinclair
