= Xeno =

Xeno may refer to:

== Prefix ==
- xeno-, a Greek prefix meaning "foreign"
- xeno-, an affix used in taxonomy

== People ==
- Xeno Müller (born 1972), Swiss athlete
- Randy Hogan (musician), nicknamed Xeno, the original lead singer for the band Cheap Trick

== Games ==
- Xeno (video game), a 1986 action video game for the ZX Spectrum
- Xeno (series), a series of Japanese role-playing video games

== Other ==
- Xeno (album), 2015 album by Japanese band Crossfaith
- Xeno (film), an American film directed by Matthew Loren Oates
- Xeno, Salamis, an area in Greece
- Xeno, a character in the Malaysian animated series Rimba Racer
- Xenophyophorea, a clade of ocean-floor foraminiferan organisms

== See also ==
- Xenon (disambiguation)
- Xenic (disambiguation)
- Zeno (disambiguation)
- Xenu (disambiguation)
- Xena (disambiguation)
- Xenos (disambiguation)
