= Dogpiling (Internet) =

Form of online harassment

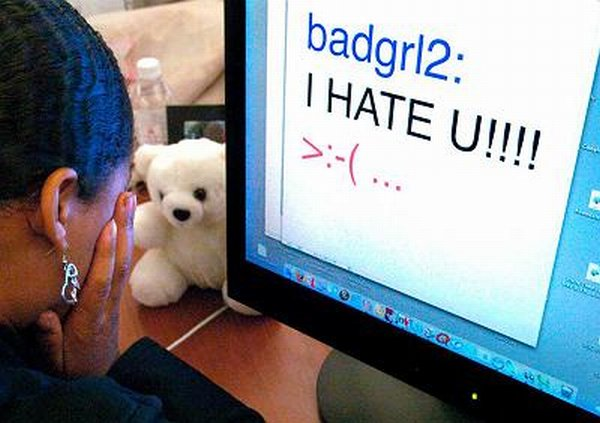
Online harassment is a common method of dogpiling.

Dogpiling, dog-piling or simply a piling-on is a form of online harassment or online abuse characterized by having groups of harassers target the same victim. Examples of online abuse include flaming, doxing (online release of personal information without consent), impersonation, and public shaming. Dog-pilers often focus on harassing, exposing, or punishing a target for an opinion that the group does not agree with, or just simply for the sake of being a bully and targeting a victim. Participants use criticism and/or insults to target a single person. In some definitions, it also includes sending private messages.

Dogpiling happens when an individual's post goes viral, and attracts substantial attention. Dogpiling occurs when people who do not agree with the post leave negative comments to the original poster. As more people leave negative comments, the original poster then becomes subject to targeted group hate. Dogpiling is one form of online harassment, and can overlap with public shaming and cyberbullying.

== Etymology ==
The word comes from the dog-pile in American football, in which a person who has the ball is targeted by the entire opposing team, who then run and jump on individual (e.g., tackling). It became popular with the rise of social networks.

== Harmful effects ==
=== On the victim ===
Dogpiling can make a person feel overwhelmed due to the large number of comments and notifications during a short amount of time. Receiving this much negative online activity can result in the original poster feeling as though they cannot openly share their thoughts and feelings without getting judged or criticized. This can make the targeted person not feel comfortable to participate within online platforms due to the high volume of backlash they received. Victims of dogpiling may feel less self-esteem, various emotional reactions, self-harm ideations, and suicidal thoughts. Adolescents, particularly female adolescents, are more likely to be susceptible to these effects from dogpiling.

=== On journalists ===
Not only does dogpiling affect social media users, it also affects journalist's ability to be able to report and share information. Online users who may not agree with the journalists articles or posts, use online harassment to strike back at journalists. The harassment is intended to silence and discourage journalists from reporting. It could result to psychological stress and damaged reputations which could result in journalists limiting the topics they discuss or leave their profession. Journalists could be intimidated by the online harassment and might censor what subjects they share and report, which can affect public dialogue.

=== Case study ===
An example of dogpiling happened in 2019 to a prominent Australian football player named Taylor Harris. She experienced online abuse and harassment after a photograph was taken of her playing football that was published on social media. The picture taken of Harris showed her kicking a ball and following through on the kick during a football match that went viral online. After the publication of the photo, Harris started receiving sexual and disturbing comments, tags, and messages from a large amount of anonymous accounts. Taylor Harris stated how the personal insults she was receiving was distressing. She described the situation as a "pile-on" that is also called a volumetric attack. Her story went international, and she spoke publicly about the abuse, but the attacks on Harris continued to escalate. Taylor Harris thought that some of the comments she was receiving were intended to try to silence her.

== See also ==
- Bandwagon effect
- Cyberbullying
- Flaming (Internet)
- Gamergate harassment campaign
- Internet troll
- Online shaming
