= Tilman Hausherr =

German software developer and critic of Scientology

- Occupation: Software developer
- Writing career
- Genres: Computer programming, Scientology criticism
- Subjects: Scientology, Relational database management system
- Website: xenu.de

Tilman Hausherr is a German citizen living in Berlin, Germany. Hausherr is well known among critics of Scientology for his frequent Usenet posts and for maintaining a website critical of Scientology. Hausherr is also the author of a software utility, Xenu's Link Sleuth, which was praised in a 2002 PC Magazine article covering 70 web builder utilities.

== Coined "Sporgery" ==
Hausherr is credited with coining the term "Sporgery" in the Usenet newsgroup alt.religion.scientology, to which he is a regular contributor. "Sporgery" refers to internet attacks that not only spam a forum with offensive posts but also misrepresent regular users by forging their names to the spam posts. The term is a blending of the words "spam" and "forgery".

== Website ==
Hausherr's website contains a large section critical of Scientology, including the "Scientology celebrities FAQ", as well as the "FAQ: Scientology in Germany" (2001). He has also contributed updates on the activities of the Church of Scientology to the magazine Berliner Dialog, published until 2005 by the non-profit organization Dialog Zentrum Berlin e.V. Hausherr was quoted in Religion Online as stating on his Web site: "Scientology is evil; its techniques evil; its practice a serious threat to the community, medically, morally and socially."

In 1998, attorneys representing the Church of Scientology sent a letter to Hausherr, telling him to remove altered Scientology images from his Web site. Hausherr had parodied copyright-protected images belonging to the Church including changing the "S" in the Scientology symbol to a dollar sign, as well as elongating the nose of the president of the organization, an image intended to evoke comparison to Pinocchio. In the course of the dispute Compuserve, which was hosting the pages and altered images, blocked his website for terms of service violations. Hausherr defended his site, saying "It's just a page making fun of Scientology--it's a form of art. Parodies are allowed under German and U.S. law."
