= Zeno family =

Patrician family in Venice

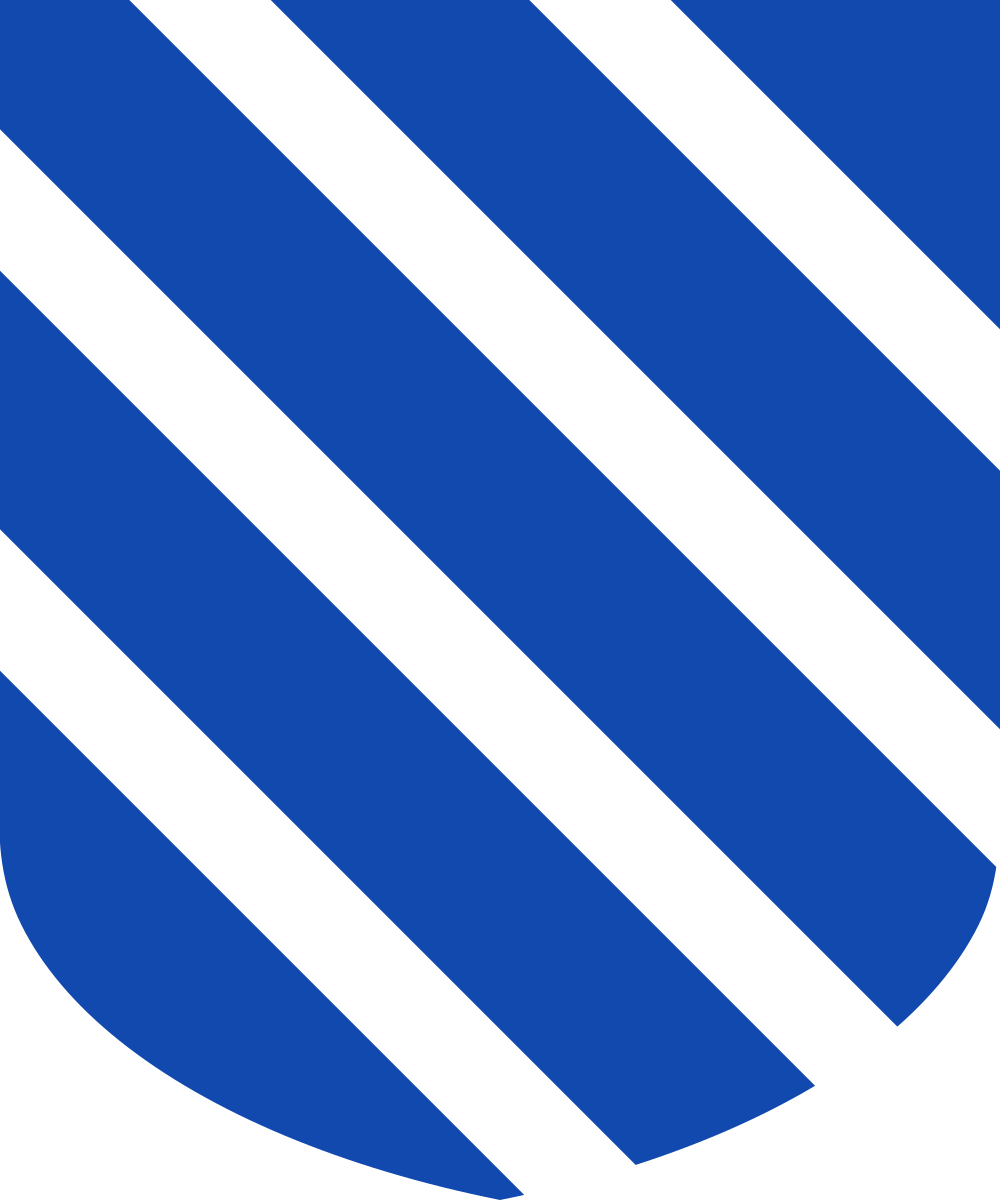
Coat of arms of Zeno family

The Zeno family, also known as Zen, was a patrician family that belonged to the small circle of Venetian noble families, whose members played important role in the history of the Republic of Venice.

== Notable members ==
- Apostolo Zeno (1669–1750) Venetian poet, librettist, and journalist.
- Carlo Zeno (1333–1418) Venetian Admiral during War of Chioggia, but also mercenary
- Giovanni Battista Zeno (died 1501), Roman Catholic Cardinal since 1468, nephew of Pope Paul II
- Nicolò Zen the younger (1515–1565) Venetian Senator and hydraulic engineer
- Pietro Zeno (died 1345) Bailo of Negroponte, commander at Adramyttion and the Smyrniote crusades
- Pietro Zeno, Lord of Andros and Syros (died 1427)
- Reniero Zeno (died 1268) 45th Doge of Venice
- Zeno brothers: Nicolò (c. 1326–c. 1402) and Antonio (died c. 1403), marine merchants and putative explorers

The family was also the owner of Villa Zeno.
