= Xenu (disambiguation) =

Xenu is a figure in the Operating Thetan teachings of Scientology.

Xenu may also refer to:

- xenu.net or Operation Clambake, a website critical of Scientology
- XENU-AM, an AM radio station in Nuevo Laredo, Tamaulipas, Mexico

== See also ==
- Xemnu, a Marvel Comics character
- Xenu's Link Sleuth, a computer program used to check web site links
- Xinu, an educational research-oriented operating system
- XNU, a computer operating system kernel
