= Sporgery =

Posting a flood of articles to a Usenet group, with falsified headers

Sporgery is the disruptive act of posting a flood of articles to a Usenet newsgroup, with the article headers falsified so that they appear to have been posted by others. The word is a portmanteau of spam and forgery, coined by German software developer, and critic of Scientology, Tilman Hausherr.

Sporgery resembles IRC flooding, which is also intended to disrupt a forum. However, sporgery is not merely disruptive but also deceptive or libellous because it involves falsifying the headers of objectionable posts so they appear to originate from newsgroup regulars. The purpose is not merely to jam the forum, but also to sully the reputations of its regular users by falsely signing their names to offensive posts.

According to internet security company ESET, sporgery was one of the vulnerabilities of the Usenet model which "probably contributed to a decline in [its] general use".

== Origins in alt.religion.scientology ==
The word sporgery was coined in the newsgroup alt.religion.scientology, an Internet newsgroup where people discuss the controversial belief system of Scientology. One of the various actions of the "war" between Scientology and the Internet involved various individuals who had posted more than a million forged newsgroup articles to the newsgroup, using the message headers (valid names and e-mail addresses) of articles written by Scientology critics and other legitimate posters, and appending to those headers the bodies of other articles harvested from racist newsgroups. The result was to flood the newsgroup with over a million forged articles that made the other posters appear to be hateful "racist bigots". Critics accused Scientology of planning and conducting the spam flood, though the organization denied this.

The apparent intent of this attack was to render the newsgroup useless for discussion and criticism of Scientology. Another purpose may have been to lower the reputation of the posters so that people would not take their criticisms of Scientology seriously.

At the peak of this attack, the attackers had six computers posting sporgeries into the newsgroup, dumping into USENET an average of 170 megabytes in 44,075 articles every month. From October 1998 to September 1999, 1,462,390,911 sporgery bytes were detected: that figure does not include what was canceled (deleted from USENET) before it could propagate. Just before the sporgery attack ended, sporgery posts were responsible for over 90% of the newsgroup's traffic.

To accomplish the sporgery attack, the spammers used several methods to acquire Internet access. Open NNTP servers were used when available, to such an extent that a great many had to be closed by their owners. When open NNTP servers subsequently became scarce, open proxies were used. These proxies allowed Scientology partisans to use someone else's computer hardware to sporge. Because default security policies in many proxy server products at the time (late 1990s) were lax, many such proxies were available for abuse. Since that time, open proxies have become the most popular resource for other spammers to abuse, eclipsing open relays and other insecure hosts.

The third method used to acquire newsgroup posting access, and the method used the most, was to use volunteers to go out and buy Internet dialup access from an Internet service provider using a false name and address, and using cash or a money order. These agents were given a large amount of cash and air fare to fly to another city, specifically to acquire Internet access for later use in sporging. Tory Bezazian was one such volunteer. She later left Scientology and publicly confessed to performing this task, and disclosed the names of the Scientology staff members who she said were in charge of the sporgery project.

The sporgery attack against alt.religion.scientology ended a few months after the name and address of one of the perpetrators was acquired by one of the victims, at which time the United States Federal Bureau of Investigation got involved. No indictments were made, nor were there any arrests.

== Other sporgery attacks ==
Since the emergence of this technique of disrupting a newsgroup, a few other groups have been targeted this way. One, news.admin.net-abuse.email, is used for discussion of spamming and other email abuse problems. A person or persons using the pseudonym "Hipcrime" have attacked this and other groups with sporgeries, usually nonsense or Dissociated Press text posted under random names of legitimate posters. Sporgery is also common in warez newsgroups.

== See also ==
- Scientology versus the internet – War between Scientology and netizens
- Joe job – Unsolicited email with spoofed sender data
- Newsgroup spam – Spam targeting Usenet newsgroups
- Spamming – Unsolicited electronic messages, especially advertisements
