= Nicolò Zeno the younger =

Venetian senator

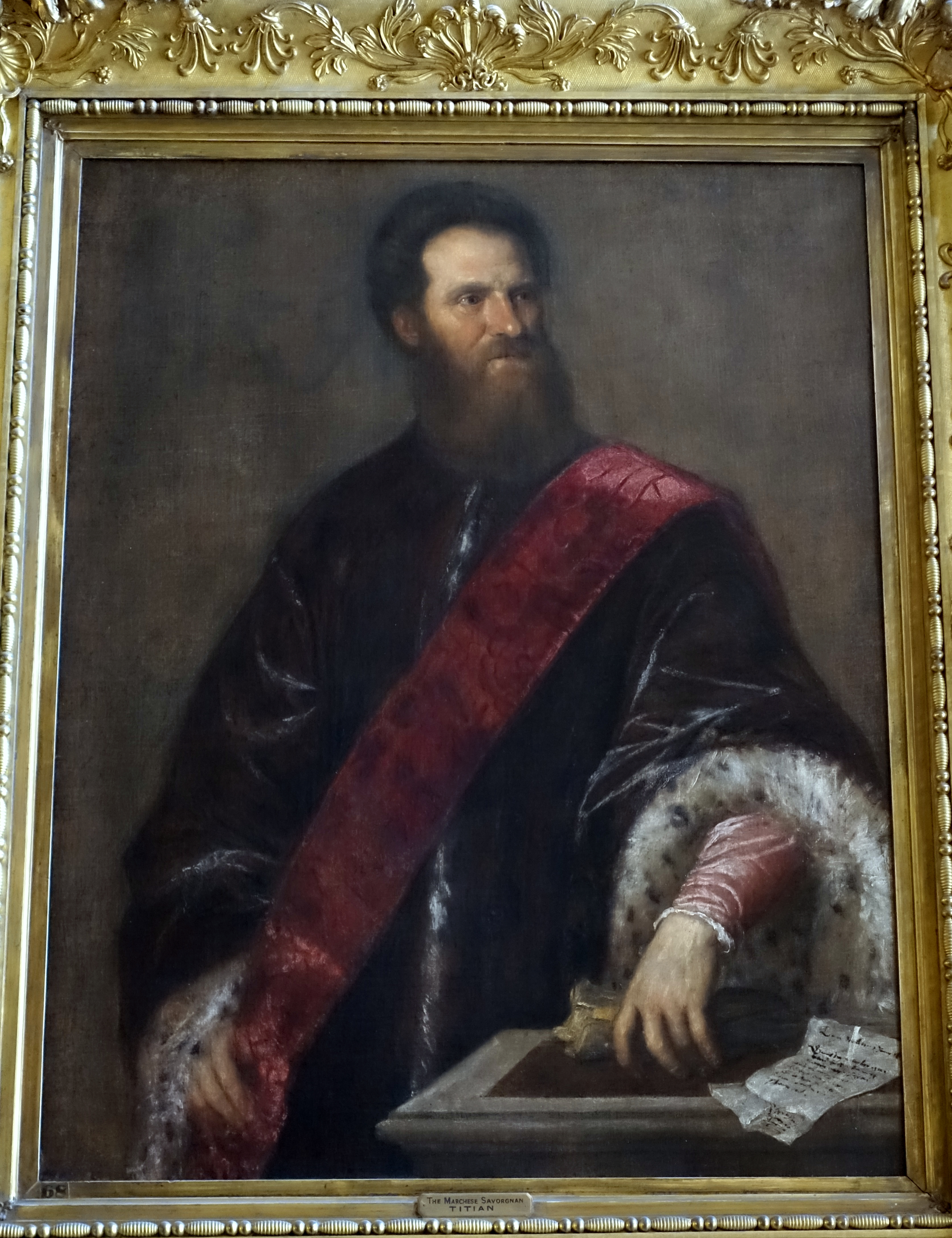
Nicolò Zen by Titian, 1560-1565, in Kingston Lacy

Nicolò Zeno or Nicolò Zen (1515–1565) was a Venetian senator, diplomat and writer. A member of the Zeno family, his is best known today for compiling an account and map of his ancestors Nicolò and Antonio Zeno's supposed voyage to islands in the North Atlantic in the late 14th century under the mysterious prince Zichmni. To distinguish him from his ancestor, he is sometimes called Nicolò Zeno the younger.

Zeno's text Dello scoprimento dell’isole Frislandia comprises supposed letters from Nicolò the elder and Antonio Zeno to family back in Venice. The account was very influential on 16th century cartography and interpretations of the North Atlantic, leading to conjecture that the Venetians participated in a voyage to the Americas before Columbus, but is understood today to have been a hoax by the younger Nicolò.

== Life ==
Nicolò was the son of Caterino Zeno, a prominent literary figure of the time. He was schooled in science and the humanities and became an accomplished hydraulic engineer. His political career started with securing the post of Savio agli ordini dell'arsenale (Special Commissioner for the Arsenal) at the age of 23. He was a direct descendent of Antonio Zeno, one of the Zeno brothers made famous by Nicolò's publication Dello scoprimento.

Although Zeno advocated a peaceful approach to the Ottoman Empire, Venice became involved in a war with them, 1537-1540. This led to the defeat of the Venetians in the Battle of Preveza which took place on 28 September 1538. By the end of the war Venice had lost many of its island possessions in the eastern Mediterranean.

== Account of the Zeno brothers's voyage ==
In 1558, Zeno published an account of the Zeno family's history. Within it is Dello scoprimento dell’isole Frislandia, Eslanda, Engrouelanda, Estotilanda, & Icaria, fatto sotto il Polo Artico, da due Fratelli Zeni (On the Discovery of the Island of Frisland, Iceland, Greenland, Estotiland and Icaria at the North Pole by the Zeno Brothers), comprising a map and series of letters describing the supposed voyage to the North Atlantic by his ancestors Nicolò and Antonio Zeno. The younger Nicolò Zeno claimed to have discovered the originals a storeroom of the family's home in Venice.

The letters and map purported to describe a voyage in the northern Atlantic undertaken by his ancestors in the 1380s and 90s. Widely accepted at the time of publication, the map was incorporated into the works of leading cartographers, including Gerardus Mercator. Modern historians and geographers have disputed the veracity of the map and the described voyages, some accusing the younger Zeno of forgery.

A long-unidentified portrait by Titian owned by the United Kingdom National Trust has been identified as Nicolò Zeno.
