= Best Summer Ever =

- Directed by: Michael Parks Randa; Lauren Smitelli
- Written by: Will Halby; Terra Mackintosh; Andrew Pilkington; Michael Parks Randa; Lauren Smitelli
- Produced by: Terra Mackintosh; Andrew Pilkington; Leah Romond; Jake Sharpless; Katie White
- Starring: Maggie Gyllenhaal; Peter Sarsgaard; Benjamin Bratt
- Cinematography: Chris Westlund
- Edited by: Sam Adelman; Frank Snider; Michael Parks Randa
- Music by: Jamie Lawrence; MuMu; Peter Halby
- Production company: Zeno Mountain Farm
- Distributed by: Freestyle Digital Media
- Release date: October 2020 (Martha's Vineyard)
- Running time: 78 minutes
- Country: United States
- Language: English

Best Summer Ever is a 2020 American musical film directed by Michael Parks Randa and Lauren Smitelli. The cast features Maggie Gyllenhaal, Peter Sarsgaard and Benjamin Bratt. Gyllenhaal and Sarsgaard, along with Ted Danson, Mary Steenburgen, Jamie Lee Curtis, Amy Brenneman, and Dominique Dauwe served as executive producers.

== Plot ==
Aspiring dancer Tony Michaels practices for a dance at Lakeview Dance Camp. As the camp season comes to an end, he and his girlfriend, Sage, bid each other farewell, but not before she gives him sunflower seeds to plant in a special place. Tony gives her his eagle necklace to remember him by. However, Tony, who is actually a high school football player, is burdened by the responsibility of winning the upcoming Homecoming game for his coach, who is also his father figure, as well as his school. Sage is constantly on the move with her two mothers, Kate and Gillian, who work as drug dealers selling medicinal marijuana. Tony plants his seeds in a memorial for his late parents.

Sage dreams of settling down in a new home and aspires for a normal life. After her family's trailer breaks down when they head for a new spot to sell marijuana, Sage senses a golden opportunity to get an education at Mount Abe High School. When she arrives, Sage is greeted by Nancy, a bubbly cheerleader who becomes her friend. Beth, the conniving captain of the cheerleading squad, hears of Sage's arrival after trying to seduce Tony to become her Homecoming King. Beth taunts Sage for her Vermont heritage, but Sage tells Nancy and the other girls at school of her summer with Tony, who tells his fellow jocks of his special time with Sage.

Beth, realizing that Sage and Tony know each other and jealous of Tony's relationship with her, devises a scheme that involves driving a wedge between the two lovers. Beth injures Nancy by deliberately fracturing her arm and lies to Sage that Nancy was killed in an accident so Sage can take her place at the cheerleading pep rally. Meanwhile, Cody, the school quarterback who holds a grudge against Tony for taking his spot as the football star, swipes Tony's phone and hands it to Beth.

At the pep rally, Beth humiliates Sage in front of the whole school. The jocks run in, and Sage realizes that Tony is actually the football star. Outside the gym, Beth blackmails Tony to join her for Homecoming, threatening to put photos of him dancing on blast if he doesn't comply. Later, Tony confesses to Sage that he was lying to her to get through the summer to cope with his reputation and he has to win Homecoming, which his school hasn't done in twenty-five years. Crushed, Sage leaves the school and vents her frustrations. She fakes sick to stay home, but reluctantly goes back under her mother Kate's encouragement.

Tony asks Sage for another chance and takes her to the tool shed in his backyard, telling her that his coach became his father figure after his parents died, football isn't the only thing he's passionate about, and he's afraid of being honest with his coach. Sage tells Tony of her family's drug dealing and that they're trying to steer clear of the law before showing him her flower garden. As Homecoming approaches, Sage prepares Tony for a dance, while at school, the latter and the athletes prepare for the Homecoming game. Meanwhile, Beth uses Cody's phone to track down Sage, discovering the marijuana her family is growing.

At school, Coach confiscates Tony's phone after catching him looking at a video of Sage. He hands it back and reminds Tony that winning Homecoming is his responsibility. That night, Tony proposes that he and Sage run off together.

The next day, Tony runs into Beth, who threatens to post the photos she took of the weed if he doesn't go along with her offer. Not wanting to turn Sage over to the police, Tony takes Beth's side. Later, Coach, having discovered that Tony went to Lakeview for the summer, reprimands him for doing so. Tony argues with him over his chosen future and attempts to kick the ball, but ends up starting a fight instead. Tony runs into town to vent his frustrations, then discovers that Sage had torn up her garden, giving him an idea.

At school, on Homecoming Day, Beth calls the police to report Sage's family's drug dealing to get her arrested, but Sage throws her cell phone into the toilet out of revenge. When she gets home, Officer Gorinsky, the town cop, goes in to investigate Sage's family's cannabis farming. Kate and Gillian arrive, and Gorinsky discovers the garden but is fooled. As Sage discovers, Tony has switched the weed with sunflowers from his parents' memorial, leaving two to honor them. All the while, Tony's big brother Kevin shows Coach a video of Tony as a kid celebrating his late mother's birthday, which is why he dreamed of becoming a dancer.

As the Homecoming game begins, Sage and Tony reunite and go to Mount Abe so Tony can win for the school. Beth confronts Sage in the hallway, preparing to trap her, but Nancy comes to her rescue and pummels Beth, giving Sage enough time to get to Homecoming. Just when it seems that the Mount Abe Eagles are losing, Tony arrives in time to pull off the dance he and Sage were working on before reconciling with his coach and winning the game. Afterwards, the whole high school comes together to celebrate the Homecoming win, with Sage and Tony finally achieving their dreams.

== Cast ==
- Shannon DeVido as Sage, the main female protagonist and the spirited daughter of drug dealers
- Rickey Wilson Jr. as Tony Michaels, the main male protagonist and an aspiring dancer who is the star kicker of the Mount Abe Eagles
- MuMu as Beth, the diabolical captain of the Mount Abe cheerleading squad and the main antagonist
- Jacob Waltuck as Cody, the envious school quarterback who has a bone to pick with Tony
- Emily Kranking as Nancy, Sage's cheerleader friend
- Bradford Haynes as Coach, Tony's surrogate father and the school coach
- Eileen Grubba and Holly Palmer as Kate and Gillian, Sage's mothers who sell medicinal cannabis
- Ajani A.J. Murray as Kevin, Tony's loyal big brother
- Lawrence Carter-Long as Officer Gorinsky, the town police officer
- Maggie Gyllenhaal as TV Reporter
- Peter Sarsgaard as Camera Man
- Benjamin Bratt as Daphne's Dad
- Phil Lussier and *Eric Folan as Phil and Eric, the sports announcers for Mount Abe
- Terra Mackintosh as Principal Donna
- Sophia Bratt as Daphne
- Christine Bruno as Midge the Mechanic

== Musical numbers ==
Best Summer Ever consists of eight original songs, written by Mumu and Peter Halby. The score was composed by Jamie Lawrence.

No.	Title	Performer(s)	Length
1.	"Best Summer Ever"	Shannon Devido, Rickey Wilson Jr. & The Zeno Ensemble	3:33
2.	"Roll Your Path"	Holly Palmer, Eileen Grubba & Shannon Devido	1:39
3.	"Beyond Glory (Score)"	Jamie Lawrence	1:08
4.	"More Than Worth the Wait"	Mumu, Shannon Devido, The Zeno Ensemble, Rickey Wilson Jr. & Jacob Waltuck	3:48
5.	"The Necklace (Score)"	Jamie Lawrence	1:25
6.	"The G"	Mumu & Jacob Waltuck	3:44
7.	"Leave Behind"	Shannon Devido	2:31
8.	"One Last Chance"	Mumu, Holly Palmer, Rickey Wilson Jr., Jacob Waltuck, Eileen Grubba, Emily Kranking, Aj Murray, Bradford Haynes, Shannon Devido & The Zeno Ensemble	3:21
9.	"Ready to Ride Dream Sequence (Score)"	Jamie Lawerence	1:29
10.	"Ready to Ride"	Rickey Wilson Jr. & Zeno Ensemble	2:56
11.	"Final Victory (Score)"	Jamie Lawrence	1:20
12.	"Homecoming"	Rickey Wilson Jr., Shannon Devido, Zeno Ensemble, Mumu, Jacob Waltuck, Eileen Grubba, Holly Palmer, Emily Kranking, Aj Murray & Bradford Haynes	3:20
13.	"Closing Credits"	Zeno Ensemble	2:05
14.	"Battle Cry (Bonus Track) [Explicit]"	Mumu	3:12
15.	"Better Without You (Bonus Track)"	Mumu	3:49
Total length:			39:26

== Release ==
The film premiered at the Martha's Vineyard Drive-In in October 2020. The film was shown online at the 2020 South by Southwest festival and was named an official selection at the 2021 SXSW festival as well, winning the special jury and screenwriting awards. In March 2021, it was announced that Freestyle Digital Media acquired North American distribution rights to the film. It was released on DVD and digital platforms on April 27, 2021.

== Reception ==
On the review aggregator website Rotten Tomatoes, 89% of 19 critics' reviews are positive, with an average rating of 6.9/10.

Calum Marsh of The New York Times selected the film as a Critic's Pick and wrote, "This is the kind of movie that vibrates with the energy of the people who made it, whose enthusiasm radiates from the screen. The actors and filmmakers seemed to have had an extremely good time bringing 'Best Summer Ever' to life. Watching it made me happy."

Leslie Felperin of The Hollywood Reporter also gave the film a positive review and wrote, "...it's hard not to get swept up in the cast and crew's joyful insouciance. Plus, the cheeky showtunes, co-written by onscreen villain MuMu and executive producer Peter Halby, are a hoot."

Joe Leydon of Variety gave the film a positive review, calling it "an irresistibly appealing musical comedy brimming with inclusivity and exuberance."

David Oliver of USA Today gave the film a positive review, writing "Imagine a world where people with disabilities didn't have to talk about their disabilities. A world where they're just people...'Best Summer Ever' is a feel-good musical and a big win for disability inclusion." USA Today also named it as one of their ten favorite movies at SXSW 2021.

Kristen Lopez of IndieWire graded the film a B and wrote, "By not acknowledging differences, Best Summer Ever takes a generic premise and makes it feel spunky and fresh.

Leslie Combemale of the Alliance of Women Film Journalists also gave the film a positive review and wrote, "Both realistic and aspirational, Best Summer Ever is the sort of movie that may be fun and frothy, but it's also needed in order for bigger studio films to consider more inclusive casting."
