= Cessalto =

- Comune
- Comune di Cessalto
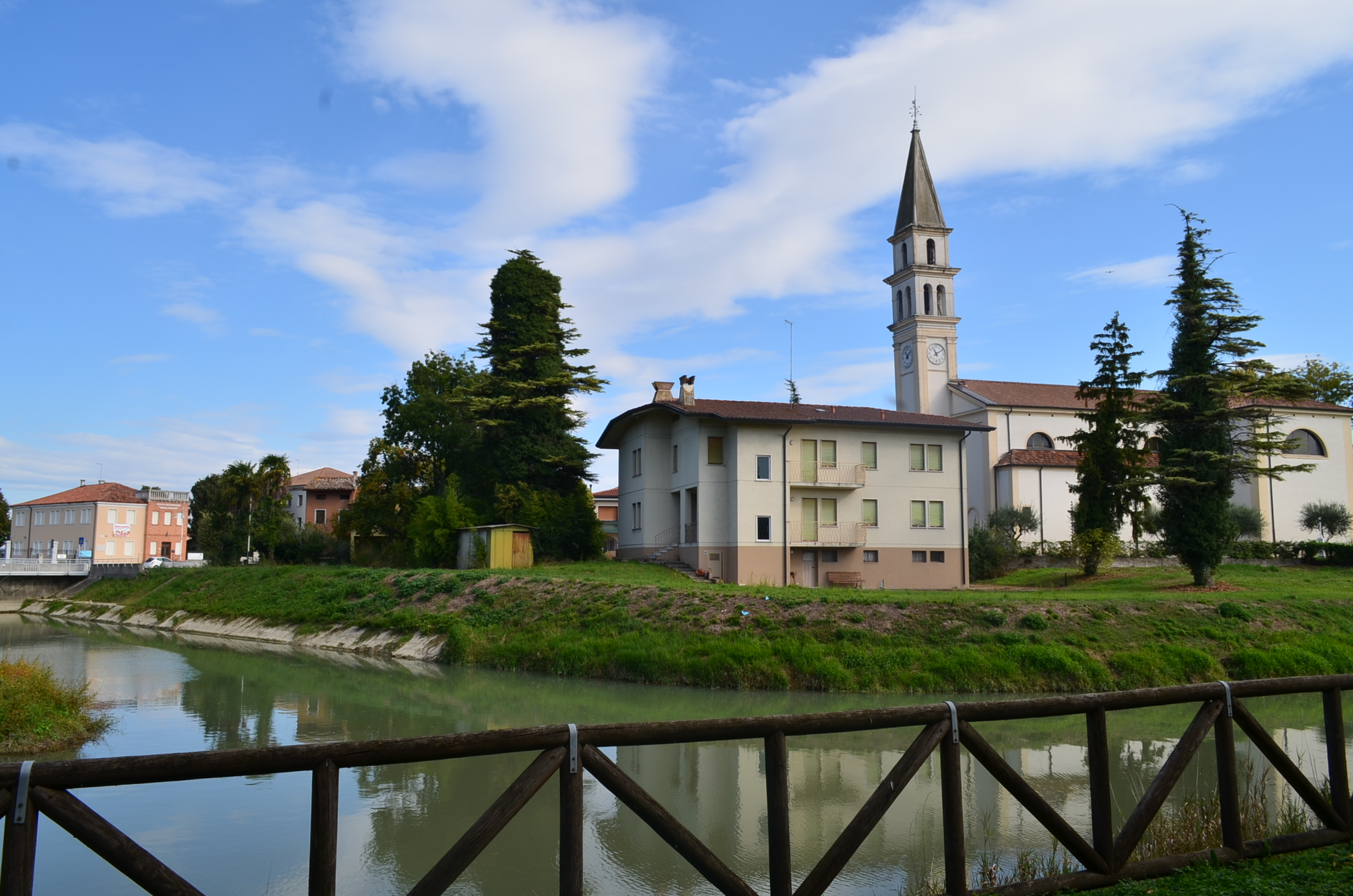

- Location within Italy Location within Veneto
- Coordinates: 45°43′N 12°37′E
- Country: Italy
- Region: Veneto
- Province: Treviso (TV)
- Frazioni: Santa Maria di Campagna, Sant'Anastasio

Government
  - Mayor: Emanuele Crosato

Area
  - Total: 28.18 km^{2} (10.88 sq mi)
- Elevation: 5 m (16 ft)

Population (30 June 2017)
  - Total: 3,832
  - Density: 136.0/km^{2} (352.2/sq mi)
- Demonym: Cessaltini
- Time zone: UTC+1 (CET)
  - Summer (DST): UTC+2 (CEST)
- Postal code: 31040
- Dialing code: 0421
- Patron saint: St. Blaise
- Saint day: February 3
- Website: Official website

Cessalto (trans. Eng.; Hightoilet) is a comune in the province of Treviso, Veneto, northern Italy. It is home to a Monopalladian Villa, the Villa Zeno.
