= Xenon (disambiguation) =

Xenon is a chemical element with symbol Xe and atomic number 54.

Xenon may also refer to:

== Computing ==
- Xenon (processor), the Xbox 360 CPU
- Xenon (program), a Dutch web spider intended to discover tax evasion
- LG Xenon, a mobile phone manufactured by LG Electronics
- Xenon, a codename for the Xbox 360

== Entertainment ==
=== Games ===
- Xenon (pinball)
- Xenon (video game)
- Self-replicating spacecraft in the X video game series
- A planet in the Space Quest series

=== Other entertainment ===
- Xenon (manga), a Japanese manga by Masaomi Kanzaki
- The Xenon Codex, a 1988 album by Hawkwind
- Xenon Entertainment, a film distribution company
- Xenon, a robot from the Superhuman Samurai Syber-Squad television show

== People ==
- Xenon (general), a Seleucid general
- Xenon (tyrant), a tyrant of the ancient Greek city of Hermione

== Vehicles ==
- Celier Xenon 2, a Polish autogyro
- Celier Xenon 4, a Maltese autogyro
- Tata Xenon, an Indian pickup truck

== Other uses ==
- Xenon (nightclub), a former New York City nightclub
- Xenon, a Campagnolo groupset
- Xenon arc lamp
- XENON Dark Matter Search Experiment

== See also ==
- Xenic (disambiguation)
- Xeno (disambiguation)
- Xeon, an Intel CPU
- Zeno (disambiguation)
- Zenon (disambiguation)
- Xe (disambiguation)
- Category:Xenon compounds
- Category:Xenon
- Isotopes of xenon
