= Zeni (surname) =

Zeni is a surname. Notable people with the surname include:

- Alberto Zeni (born 1980), Mexican actor
- Luisa Zeni (1896–1940), Italian secret agent and writer
- Marco Zeni, Italian journalist

== See also ==
- Zeni (disambiguation)
- Zeno (surname)
