= Xenic =

Xenic may refer to:

- Xenon
  - Xenon compounds
    - Xenic acid
- Sino-Xenic language
  - Sino-xenic pronunciation
  - Xenic Chinese characters
- Xenogenders

== See also ==
- Xenon (disambiguation)
- Xeno (disambiguation)
