= Breidbart Index =

Most significant cancel index in Usenet

The Breidbart Index, developed by Seth Breidbart, is the most significant cancel index in Usenet.

A cancel index measures the dissemination intensity of substantively identical articles. If the index exceeds a threshold the articles are called newsgroup spam. They can then be removed using third party cancel controls.

== Cancel Index ==
- Crossposting is the act of posting the same message to multiple newsgroups
- Multiposting is the act of posting the same contents multiple times

The principal idea of the Breidbart-Index is to give these methods different weight. With a crossposted message less data needs to be transferred and stored. And excessive crossposts (ECP) are also a likely beginner's error, while excessive multiposts (EMP) suggest deliberate usage of special software.

The crucial issue is categorizing multiple articles as substantively identical. This includes

- byte-for-byte identical messages
- otherwise identical postings minimally customized for each group it appears in
- advertising the same service
- articles that consist solely of the same signature
- articles which consist of inclusions of other user's postings, but are otherwise identical

== Breidbart Index (BI) ==
The Breidbart Index of a set of articles is defined as the sum of the square root of n, where n is the number of newsgroups to which an article is cross posted.

Formula

$\mbox{BI} = \sum_{k=1}^m \sqrt{n_k}$

Example

Two copies of a posting are made, one to 9 groups, and one to 16.

$\sqrt{9} + \sqrt{16} = 3 + 4 = 7$

== Breidbart-Index, Version 2 (BI2) ==
A more aggressive criterion, Breidbart Index Version 2, has been proposed. The BI2 is defined as the sum of the square root of n, plus the sum of n, divided by two. A single message would only need to be crossposted to 35 newsgroups to breach the threshold of 20.

Formula

$\mbox{BI2} = \sum_{k=1}^m \frac{n_k + \sqrt{n_k}}{2}$

Example

Two copies of a posting are made, one to 9 groups, and one to 16.

$\frac{\sqrt{9} + \sqrt{16} + 9 + 16}{2} = \frac{3 + 4 + 9 + 16}{2} = \frac{32}{2} = 16$

== Skirvin-Breidbart Index (SBI, BI3) ==
The name Skirvin-Breidbart Index and the abbreviation SBI are mentioned in the Spam Thresholds FAQ. However, in hierarchy nl.* this index is called BI3.

The SBI is calculated similarly to the BI2 but adds up the number of groups in Followup-to: (if present) instead of the number of groups in Newsgroups:. This encourages the use of Followup-to:.

Example

Two posts contain the same text. One is crossposted to 9 groups. The other is crossposted to 16, with four groups in Followup-to:.

$\frac{\sqrt{9} + \sqrt{16} + 9 + 4}{2} = \frac{3 + 4 + 9 + 4}{2} = \frac{20}{2} = 10$

== BI7 and BI30 ==
In hierarchy de.* the Breidbart index is used with a time range of seven days instead of 45. This is denoted by the abbreviation BI7.

In hierarchy hamster.de.* the Breidbart index is used with a time range of 30 days instead of 45. This is denoted by the abbreviation BI30.

== Cancel Index in at.* ==
This is defined in the FAQ of the group at.usenet.cancel-reports. The term used in the Call for Votes and in the FAQ is "Cancel-Index". Unofficial abbreviations are CI and ACI.

The ACI of a single post equals 3 plus the number of groups that the post was sent to. The index of multiple posts is the sum of the indices of the individual posts.

== Thresholds ==
- According to RFC 1036 only the author of the target message or the administrator of the site that injected the message is allowed to send a cancel.
- According to the Spam Thresholds FAQ a BI of 20/45 applies to all hierarchies. Series of articles above this limit may be canceled by everyone.
- In some hierarchies alternative (stricter) limits were defined through a public vote.
- No cancel messages or any derivatives thereof are allowed within free.*.

In fact a cancel message is a just a non-binding request to remove a certain article. News server operators can freely decide on how to implement the conflicting policies.

Hierarchy	Cancel Index	Time Range	Limit	Reports	Definition
*	BI	45	20	news.admin.net-abuse.bulletins	
at.*	ACI	45	11	at.usenet.cancel-reports	
at.anzeigen.*	ACI	14	4	at.usenet.cancel-reports	
bln.*	BI	45	3		
de.*	BI	7	5	de.admin.net-abuse.announce	
de.alt.dateien.*	BI	45	1	de.admin.net-abuse.announce	
de.markt.*	BI	45	2	de.admin.net-abuse.announce	
es.*	BI	45	20		
fr.*	BI	30	4	fr.usenet.abus.rapports	
hamster.de.*	BI	30	3	hamster.cancelreport	
it.*	BI	45	20	it.news.net-abuse	
muc.*	BI	45	2		
nl.*	SBI		10	nl.internet.misbruik.rapport	
nrw.*	BI	7	2		
schule.*	BI	14	3	schule.cancelreport	
