= San Zenone =

San Zenone is the Italian name of Zeno of Verona, an Italian Catholic saint.

It may also refer to:

- San Zenone al Lambro, a municipality in the Province of Milan, Lombardy
- San Zenone al Po, a municipality in the Province of Pavia, Lombardy
- San Zenone degli Ezzelini, a municipality in the Province of Treviso, Veneto

== See also ==
- Zenone (disambiguation)
- San Zeno (disambiguation)
- Sanzeno
