= Cenon Gallicanon =

Town in ancient Bithynia

Coordinates: 40°25′17″N 30°43′50″E

Cenon Gallicanon was a town of ancient Bithynia, inhabited during Roman times. Its name does not occur in ancient authors but is inferred from epigraphic and other evidence.

Its site is located near Göynük in Asiatic Turkey.
