= Zeni =

Zeni may refer to:

- Zeni (letter), a letter of the Georgian alphabet
- Zeni, Iran, a village in South Khorasan Province, Iran
- Zeni Husmani (born 1990), Macedonian footballer
- Zeni (surname), surname

== See also ==
- Zenigata Heiji, a fictional policeman
