= Frisland =

Phantom island in the North Atlantic

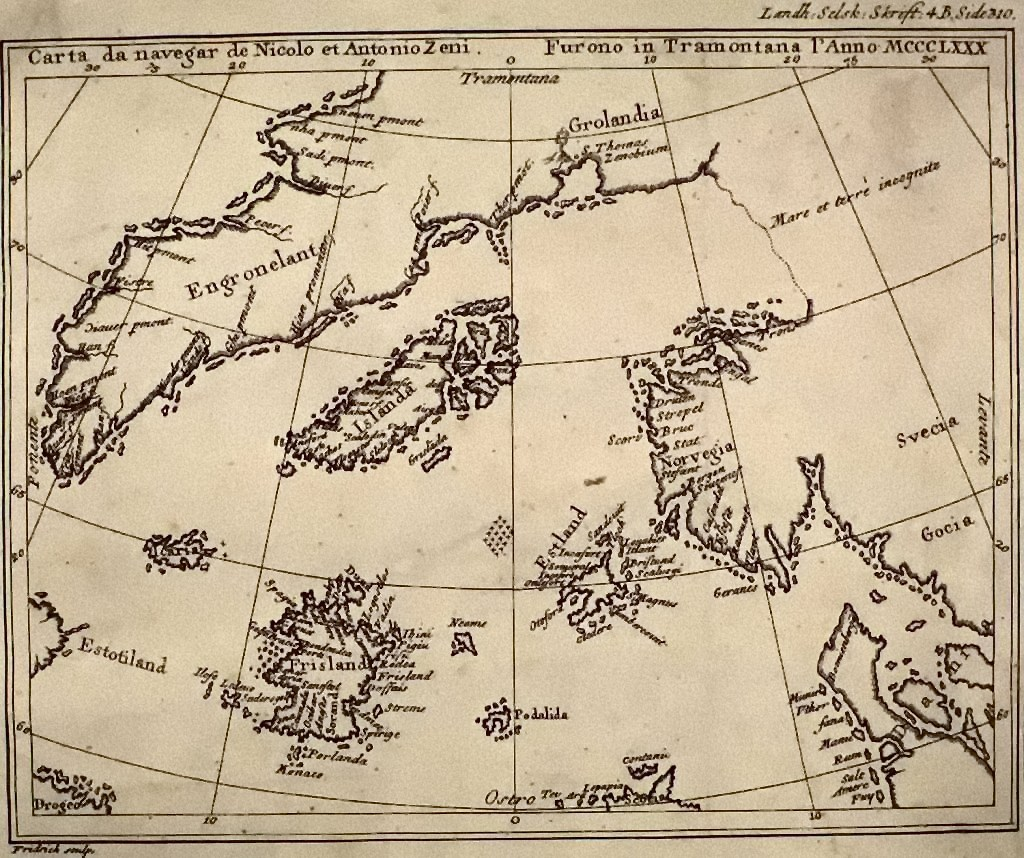
The Zeno map showing Frisland to the lower left

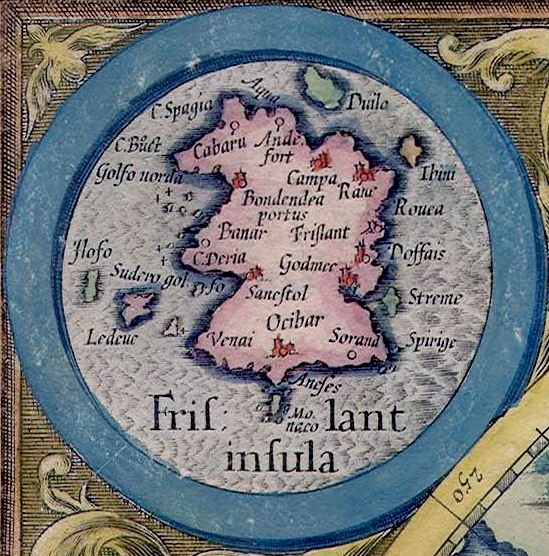
Frisland detail from Mercator's 1623 Arctic map

Frisland, also called Frischlant, Friesland, Frislanda, Frislandia, or Fixland, is a phantom island that appeared on virtually all of the maps of the North Atlantic from the 1560s through the 1660s. It was removed as no Frisland was found as the area was more thoroughly explored and navigation increased. Accurate navigation was more difficult in this time (before more accurate marine chronometers), and it might have originated from a misidentification of the Faroe Islands, Iceland, or Greenland.

== History ==
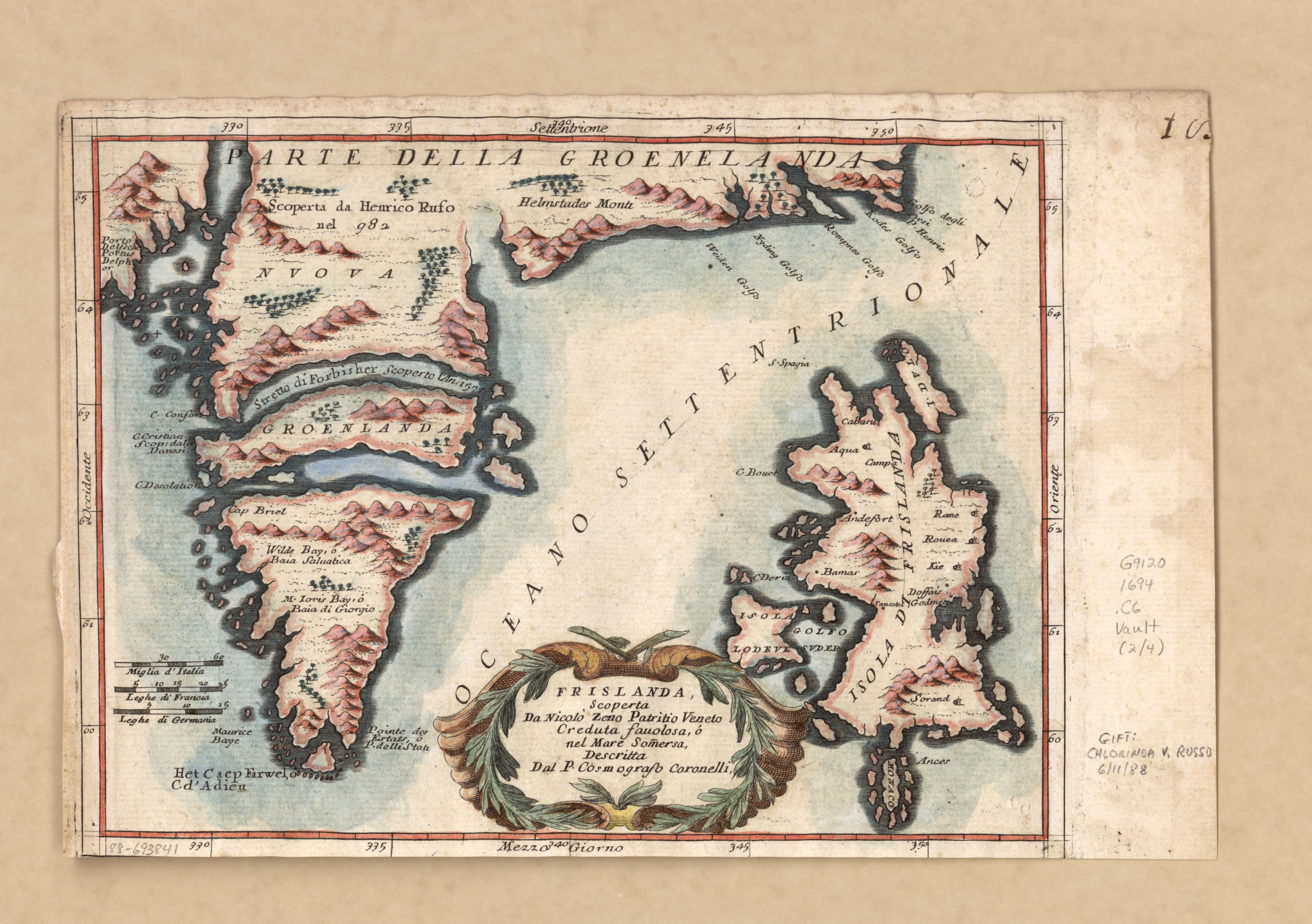
Map of Frisland, with part of (southern) Greenland: Frislanda and Parte della Groenelanda

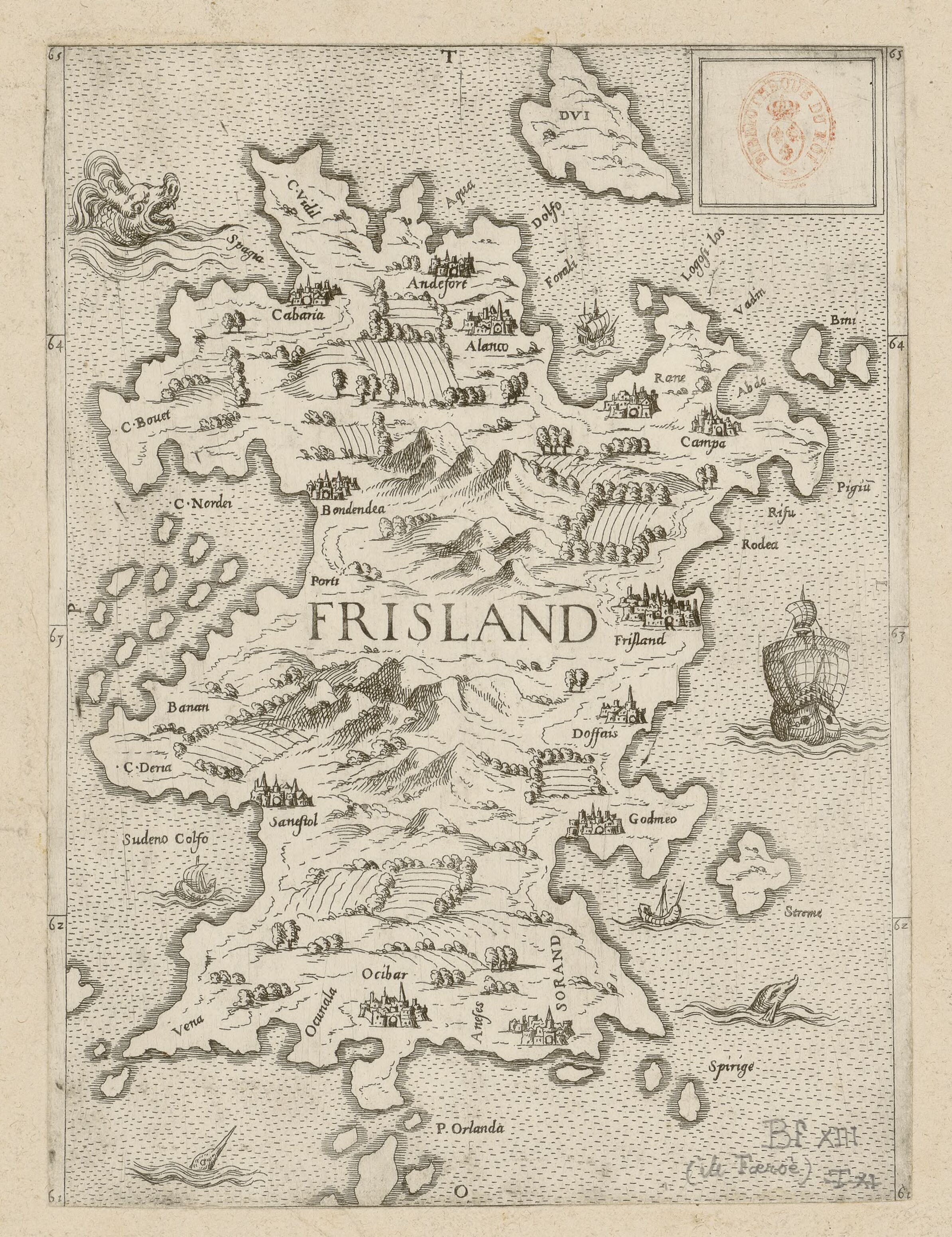
Map from 1562 with a more detailed coastline and many cities of Frisland. On the far north Cabaria and Andefort for example

Frisland is first mentioned in 1558 when Nicolò Zen the younger published a series of letters and a map entitled On the Discovery of the Island of Frislanda, Eslanda, Engroenland (sometimes Engroneland), Estotiland & Icaria, made by two Zen Brothers under the Arctic Pole which he claimed to have discovered in a storeroom of the family's home in Venice. The letters and map purported to describe a voyage in the northern Atlantic undertaken by his ancestors, Nicolò and Antonio Zeno, in the 1390s. Gerardus Mercator added it under the name "Frislant" in his 1569 planispherre world map as did Abraham Ortelius in his 1570 atlas. Some early maps by Willem Blaeu, such as his 1617 map of Europe, omit it, but it reappeared on his 1630 world map as one of many islands shown off the eastern coast of Labrador, which was then believed to extend to within a few hundred miles of Scotland. It also appeared on a 1652 world map by Visscher, largely copied from that of Blaeu. The 1693 Vincenzo Coronelli map places it close to Greenland describing it as “Frislanda, Scoperta Da Nicolò Zeno Patritio Veneto Creduta fauolosa, ò nel Mare Sommersa, Descritta Dal P. Cosmografo Coronelli” (‘Frisland, discovered by Nicolò Zeno, a Venetian patrician, believed to be a fable, or submerged in the sea’)". Even in the mid-18th century, explorers' maps clearly depicted Frisland as separated from Greenland by a wide strait. Frisland also appears in later literary works, including the French romance Histoire de Falitz et Melliflore (1818), in which the island forms part of a symbolic and fictionalized geographical setting rather than a cartographic claim; the work was later translated into English under the title The Tale of Falitz and Melliflore.

The myth of Frisland was gradually dispensed with as explorers, chiefly from England and France, charted and mapped the waters of the North Atlantic.

In a French book, Canadian map curator Alban Berson pointed out that in the 18th century, upon reexamining the calculation of Frisland's coordinates, French geographer Philippe Buache concluded that it was the Faroe Islands. Berson shows that the toponymy corroborates this theory. The oldest printed map of this archipelago was published in 1673 by the Dane Lucas Jacobsøn Debes. If we compare this map with Zeno's map of Frisland, we find many points of convergence. The name “Frisland” itself is similar to “Færorarum” used by Debes and even closer to the Old Danish “Færöislanda”. The small isolated island called “Ledeve” on Zeno's map is reminiscent of Debes' “Little Dimen”. In the South, “Sundero colfo” corresponds to “Süderöe fiord”, “Portlanda” to “Porchÿrs Nas”, and “Sorand” to “Süderöe”. The southernmost point on both maps has the same name in Italian and Danish, “Monaco” and “Münck”. It is a rock whose shape resembled a monk. To the West, “Godmec” could be “Götenes”. To the north, Zeno's northernmost island, “Dvilo”, corresponds to “Videröe”, and “Andefort” to “Andefiord”.

Frisland would therefore not be so much an imaginary island as a real archipelago, very incorrectly located and depicted in an unrecognizable way: the Faroe Islands.

=== Depiction ===
Frisland was shown as a roughly rectangular island, with three triangular promontories on its western coast.

In some mappings, it is identified as "Fixland". (Matteo Prunes map of 1553, from Library of Congress, see upper right of map; see also, page 88 for other clearer source; see also Catalan map of 1480 showing "Fixland"; original source map copied in this article, page 64.)

== See also ==
- Buss Island (mid-atlantic phantom island, late 1500s to early 1800s)
- Estotiland (Another phantom from the Voyage of the Zeno brothers)
- Martin Frobisher (English sailor who claimed to have seen Frisland)
- Atlantis (alleged lost island city of antiquity)
- Azores (actual islands in the Atlantic)
  - Statue of Corvo
- Faroe Islands (another set of actual islands in the North Atlantic in between Iceland and the U.K)
- Shetland (islands between Faroe and Orkney, Scotland)
- Baffin Island (an island west of Greenland)
- Mid-Atlantic Ridge
- Jan Mayen (real but uninhabited island north of Iceland)
- Svalbard (real island east of Greenland and north of Norway)
  - Bear Island (Svalbard) (real island near Svalbard)
- Doggerland (a real but now submerged land in north sea)
- Early Holocene sea level rise
