= Tenon =

Tenon may refer to:

- one of the two elements of a mortise and tenon joint
- Tenon capsule, a membrane around the eyeball
- Tenon Group, a chartered accountancy company in the United Kingdom
- Tenon Limited, a New Zealand-based publicly traded company producing timber products
- Tenon saw, a type of backsaw
  - Japanese saw, includes Douzukinoko, Azebiki, Kugihiki types used for making tenons, mortise in woodworking
- Jacques-René Tenon (1724–1816), a French surgeon
