= Xenu's Link Sleuth =

Broken hyperlink checking computer program

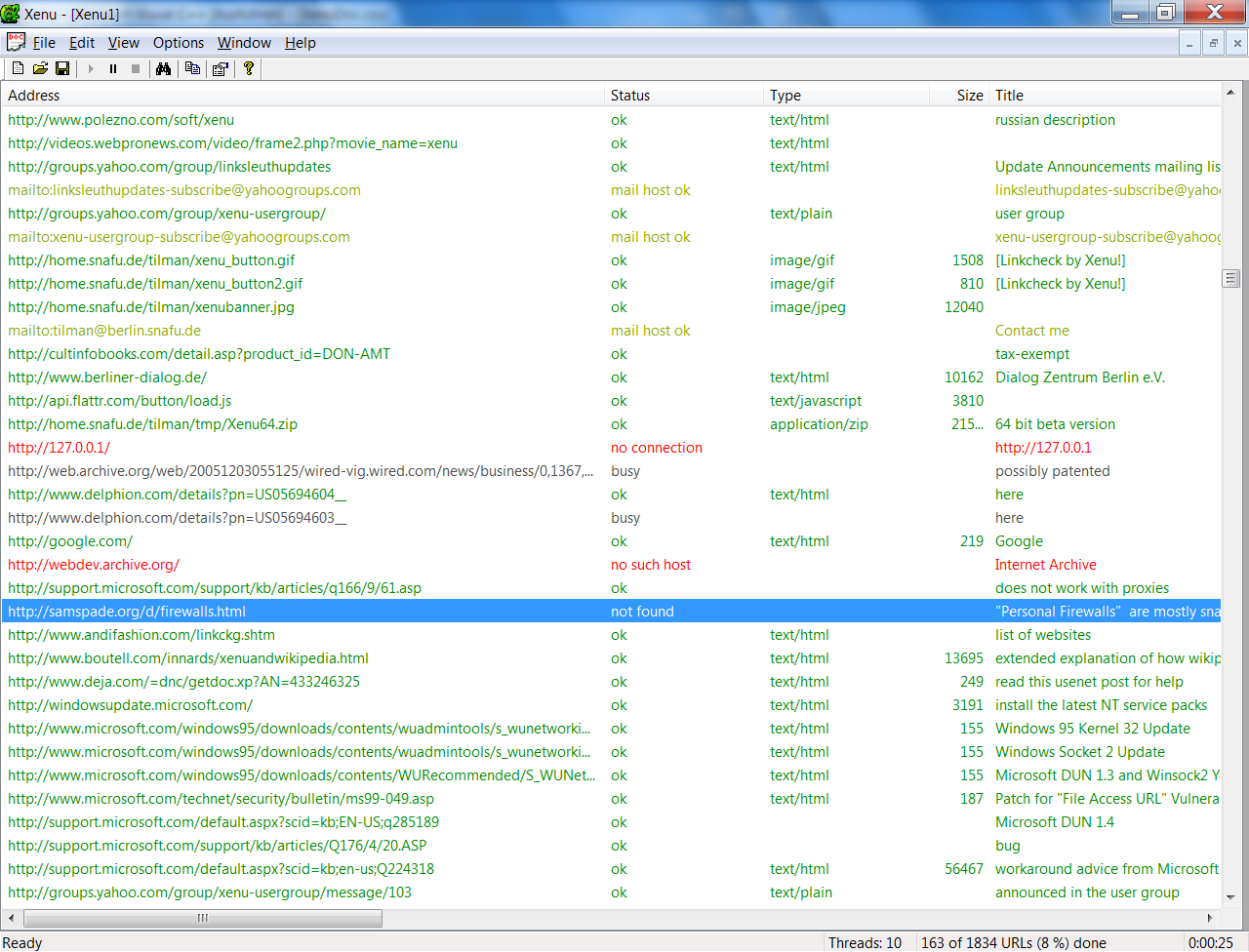
- Screenshot of Xenu's Link Sleuth
- Developer(s): Tilman Hausherr
- Stable release: 1.3.8 / September 4, 2010; 15 years ago
- Written in: C++
- Operating system: Microsoft Windows
- Available in: English
- Website: home.snafu.de/tilman/xenulink.html

Xenu, or Xenu's Link Sleuth, is a computer program that checks websites for broken hyperlinks. It is written by Tilman Hausherr and is proprietary software available at no charge. The program is named after Xenu, the galactic ruler from Scientology scripture.

== Format ==
Link Sleuth runs on Microsoft Windows. Link verification is performed on links which appear in <a> tags, as well as images, frames, plug-ins, backgrounds, local image maps, style sheets, scripts, and Java applets. The program follows links to other pages, and checks the links on those pages also, so it is possible to check an entire site for broken links in one session. Xenu displays a continuously updated list of URLs which can be sorted according to different criteria. The program uses a "simple, no-frills user-interface", and can help users understand how certain Web sites are structured. The program has support for SSL Web sites.

== Reception ==
Xenu's Link Sleuth software was called the "fastest link-checking software" by PC Magazine, and "amazingly fast and very accurate" by a University of Wyoming newsletter. The software was used as a testing tool in a usability study at Grand Valley State University.

Xenu's Link Sleuth has also been cited by Rossett's The ASTD E-Learning Handbook, Zhong's Intelligent Technologies for Information Analysis, Gerrard's Risk-Based E-Business Testing, Reynolds' The Complete E-Commerce Book, Slocombe's Max Hits: Websites that Work, George's The ABC of SEO, as well as the German books Homepage-Erfolg, and Einführung in XHTML CSS und Webdesign, and Italian books, Plasmare il web, and Il check-up dei siti Web.
