= Zenon (surname) =

Zenon or Zenón is the surname of the following notable people:

- Golden J. Zenon Jr. (1929–2006), African-American architect
- Kevin Zenón (born 2001), Argentine footballer
- Miguel Zenón (born 1976), Puerto Rican musician
- Paul Zenon (born 1964), English magician
- Tanguy Zenon (born 2002), France rugby league footballer
