= Villa Zeno =

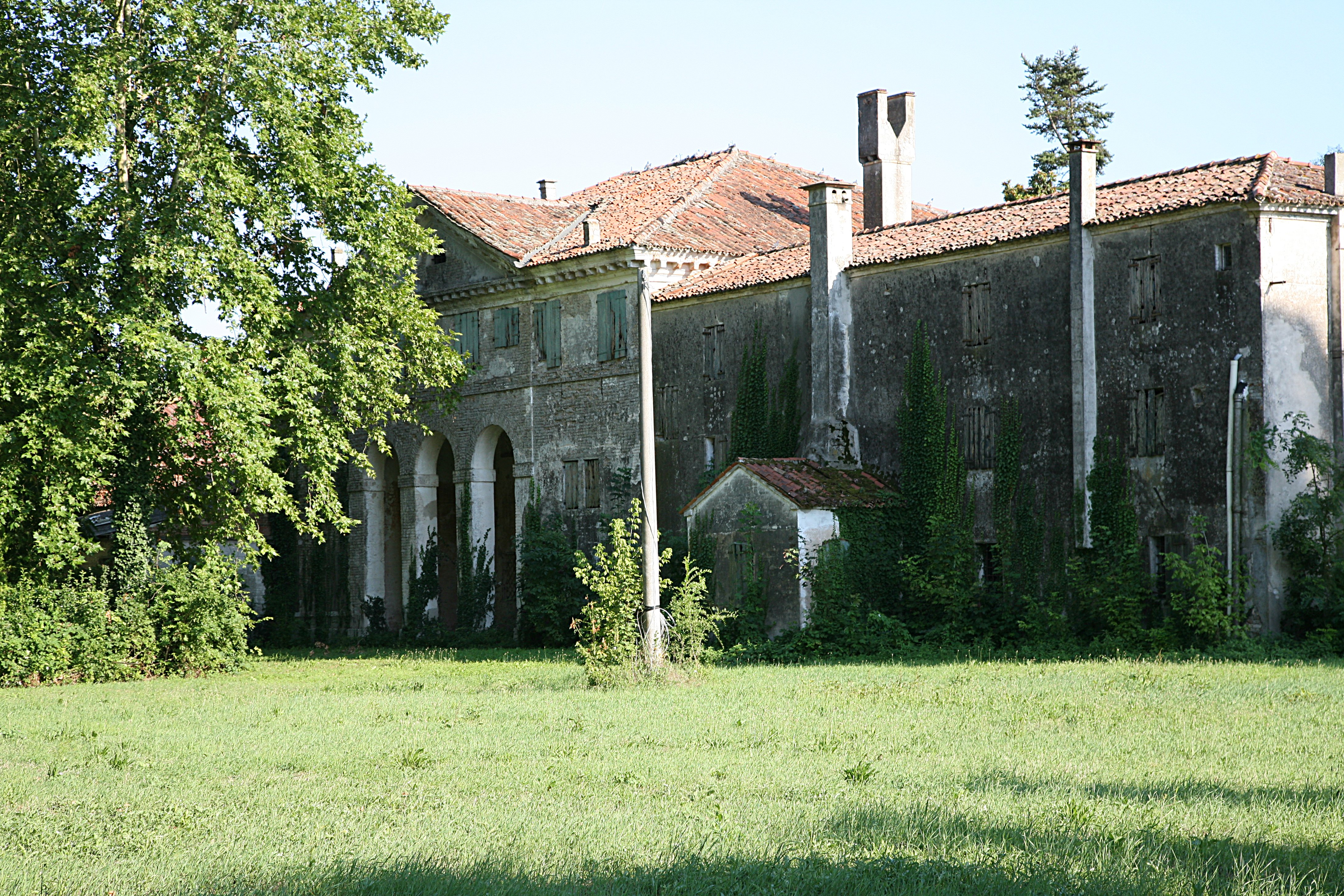

General information
- Architectural style: Palladian
- Location: Cessalto, Italy
- Coordinates: 45°42′01″N 12°38′35″E
- Construction started: 1550s
- Completed: modified over the centuries
- Client: Marco Zeno

Design and construction
- Architect: Andrea Palladio

UNESCO World Heritage Site
- Part of: City of Vicenza and the Palladian Villas of the Veneto
- Criteria: Cultural: (i), (ii)
- Reference: 712bis-020
- Inscription: 1994 (18th Session)
- Extensions: 1996
- Area: 7.71 ha (19.1 acres)

Villa Zeno is a patrician villa at Cessalto, Veneto, northern Italy, and is the most easterly villa designed by Italian Renaissance architect Andrea Palladio. The building is near the highway between Venice and Trieste, but was built to face a canal which served as the primary means of arrival.

== History ==
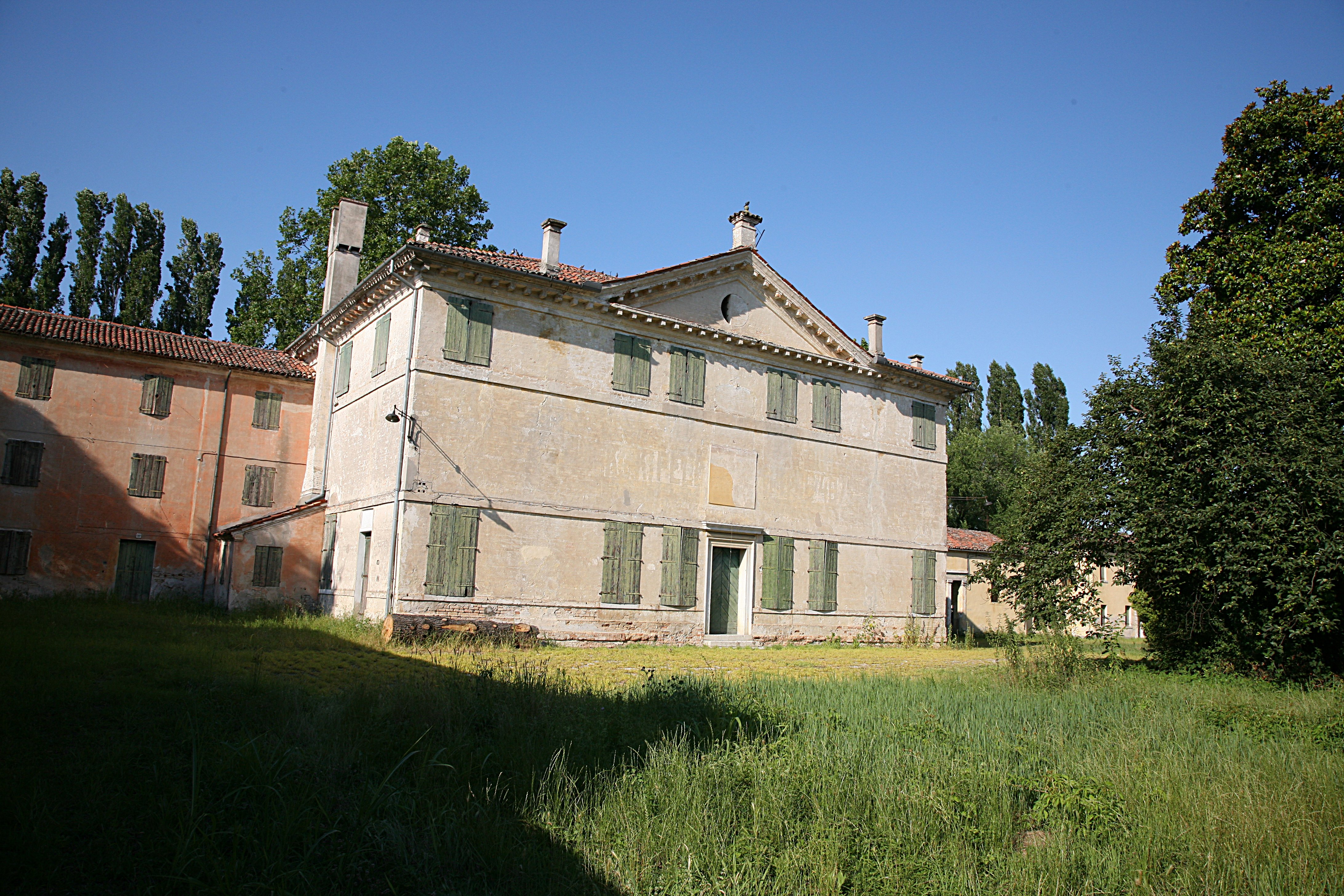
Rear view of the villa

Palladio's building for the Zeno family has been dated to the 1550s. It is illustrated in I quattro libri dell'architettura, the architect's influential publication of 1570, and has similarities to some of the other villas described there such as the Villa Saraceno. It is also reminiscent of Villa Caldogno Nordera, which is attributed to Palladio, but is not included in I quattro libri.

Palladio appears to have incorporated an existing building, and his villa has had several modifications. Its Palladian features include a facade characterised by a triple-arched loggia. The roof is capped with period clay tiles, and the structure is of brick covered with stucco, typical of Palladio who was able to achieve great buildings with what are commonly regarded as inferior materials.

== Conservation ==
In 1996, it was designated by UNESCO as part of the World Heritage Site "City of Vicenza and the Palladian Villas of the Veneto". The villa is in need of restoration.

== See also ==
- Palladian Villas of the Veneto
- Palladian architecture
