= Newsgroup spam =

Spam targeting Usenet newsgroups

Newsgroup spam is a type of spam where the targets are Usenet newsgroups. Usenet convention defines spamming as excessive multiple posting, i.e. repeated posting of a message or similar messages to newsgroups. The spam may be commercial advertisements, opinionated messages, malicious files, or nonsensical posts designed to disrupt the newsgroups. A type of newsgroup spam is sporgery which is intended to make the targeted newsgroups unreadable. The prevalence of Usenet spam led to the development of the Breidbart Index as an objective measure of a message's "spamminess", and attempts to purge newsgroups of spam.

== History ==
Spamming of Usenet newsgroups pre-dates e-mail spam. The first widely recognized Usenet spam (though not the most famous) was posted on 18 January 1994 by Clarence L. Thomas IV, a sysadmin at Andrews University. Entitled "Global Alert for All: Jesus is Coming Soon", it was a fundamentalist religious tract claiming that "this world's history is coming to a climax." The newsgroup posting bot Serdar Argic also appeared in early 1994, posting tens of thousands of messages to various newsgroups, consisting of identical copies of a political screed relating to the Armenian genocide.

The first "commercial" Usenet spam, and the one which is often (mistakenly) claimed to be the first Usenet spam of any sort, was an advertisement for legal services entitled "Green Card Lottery – Final One?". It was posted on 12 April 1994, by Arizona lawyers Laurence Canter and Martha Siegel, and hawked legal representation for United States immigrants seeking green cards.

Usenet convention defines spamming as "excessive multiple posting", that is, the repeated posting of a message (or substantially similar messages). During the early 1990s there was substantial controversy among Usenet system administrators (news admins) over the use of cancel messages to control spam. A "cancel message" is a directive to news servers to delete a posting, causing it to be inaccessible. Some regarded this as a bad precedent, leaning towards censorship, while others considered it a proper use of the available tools to control the growing spam problem.

A culture of neutrality towards content precluded defining spam on the basis of advertisement or commercial solicitations. The word "spam" was usually taken to mean "excessive multiple posting (EMP)", and other neologisms were coined for other abuses – such as "velveeta" (from the processed cheese product of that name) for "excessive cross-posting". A subset of spam was deemed "cancellable spam", for which it is considered justified to issue third-party cancel messages.

In the late 1990s, spam became used as a means of vandalising newsgroups, with malicious users committing acts of sporgery to make targeted newsgroups all but unreadable without heavily filtering. A prominent example occurred in alt.religion.scientology.

Prevalent in recent times is the MI-5 Persecution spam, which is known across multiple newsgroups. These rambling postings often appear as clusters of twenty or more messages with varying subjects and content, but all related to Mike Corley's perceived surveillance of himself by MI5, the British intelligence agency. These rambling messages used to state the originator as MI5Victim@mi5.gov.uk. Lately (December 2007) the spammer has taken to altering the "from" address and subject line in an attempt to get past newsgroup "kill" filters. This UK-based spammer readily admits that he has mental illness in several of his postings. See also The Corley Conspiracy.

The prevalence of Usenet spam led to the development of the Breidbart Index as an objective measure of a message's "spamminess". The use of the BI and spam-detection software has led to Usenet being policed by anti-spam volunteers, who purge newsgroups of spam by sending cancels and filtering it out on the way into servers. This very active form of policing has meant that Usenet is a far less attractive target to spammers than it used to be, and most of the industrial-scale spammers have now moved into e-mail spam instead.

== Google Usenet news archive ==
The advent of the large Usenet archive kept as part of the Google Groups website, has made Usenet more attractive to spammers than ever. The goal in this case is not just to reach the members of a newsgroup, but to also take advantage of the fact that Google gives a higher pagerank to websites that are referred to by these messages, which are catalogued and mirrored in multiple languages at Google's top-level domain. Critics have suggested that Google has ulterior motives for "turning a blind eye" to the problem since the websites being pointed to use Google ads, which potentially generate revenue for both the spammer AND Google. The spam is extremely unfair to the companies paying Google and the spammer for an ad-click, as the most prevalent current spam (2010) is trying to trick readers into clicking on web ads by referring to them as images and saying that a link is hidden in them "due to high sex content" or that a link hidden in the image (Google ad) will take them to a "PayPal form" that will give them money.

While most newsreaders filter the spam at either the server or user level, Google does not filter spam out of its Usenet News archive. Google does, however, offer spam filtering for groups that decide to abandon Usenet and form a moderated Google Group, which gives another reason why Google would turn a blind eye to spam in its archive of Usenet News.

== See also ==
- Cancelbot – Automated process for sending out third-party cancel messages over Usenet
- Meow Wars – Early example of a flame war sent over Usenet
- Sporgery – Posting a flood of articles to a Usenet group, with falsified headers
