= Zenon =

Zenon may refer to

== Industry ==
- ZENON Environmental, a Canadian water treatment company based in Oakville, Ontario
- Zenon Petroleum and Gas, importer of fuel products

== Fiction ==
- Zenon: Girl of the 21st Century (film)
- Zenon: The Zequel , a 2001 Disney Channel Original Movie directed by Manny Coto
- Zenon: Z3 television film trilogy, following Zenon: Girl of the 21st Century (1999) and Zenon: The Zequel (2001)
- Monthly Comic Zenon, a Japanese manga anthology
- Zenon: Girl of the 21st Century, a 1997 children's science fiction picture book written by Marilyn Sadler and illustrated by Roger Bollen

== Fictional characters ==
- Great Demon King Zenon, leader of the demons in the manga and anime Devilman
- Overlord Zenon, antagonist from the video game Disgaea 2: Cursed Memories
- Zenon Kar, title character in the film Zenon: Girl of the 21st Century
- Zénon Ligre, alchemist, the protagonist of Marguerite Yourcenar's novel The Abyss
- Zenon Zogratis, antagonist and human host of a demon, of the manga Black Clover
- Zenón Barriga y Pesado, character in the Mexican sitcom El Chavo del Ocho

== People ==
- Zenon (name), an Ancient Greek name, derived from the theonym Zeus
- Zenon (given name)
- Zenon (surname)

== Others ==
- Zenon or Cyclone Numa, 2017 Mediterranean tropical-like cyclone
- Asteroid 6186 Zenon

== See also ==
- Zeno (disambiguation)
- Zenone (disambiguation)
- Xenon
