= Zeno Mountain Farm =

Organization

Logo

Zeno Mountain Farm (or Zeno for short) is a non-profit, year round organization that hosts camps for people with and without disabilities. The flagship camp of Zeno Mountain Farm is held in Bristol, Vermont, during July. Satellite camps are held in Los Angeles and Jensen Beach. In total the camp is in session for 120 days a year. Each camp session has a specific goal ranging from putting on a play to participating in athletic events. The camp is run entirely by donations and volunteers, allowing for all campers to attend without cost. Recently the organization has produced films projects utilizing people with disabilities both on-screen and behind the scenes, including the feature Best Summer Ever, which premiered at the 2020 South by Southwest Film Festival.

== History ==
Will and Peter Halby, together with their wives, Vanessa and Ila, founded Zeno Mountain Farm in 2008, making a commitment to spend their lives creating opportunities for and with people with disabilities and diverse needs. A documentary film about Zeno Mountain Farm, directed by Micheal Barnett titled "Becoming Bulletproof" was released in 2014. The film follows the making of a Western film by the volunteers and campers.

== Vermont summer camp ==
Zeno Mountain Farm holds a month-long, flagship, summer camp in July in which the participants engage in a variety of activities. Campers swim, windsurf, do arts and crafts, dance, sing and hold bonfires. The two main activities are creating a float and costumes for the annual Fourth of July parade held in the town of Bristol, and producing and performing a play, open to the public, on the final days of camp.

== Satellite camps ==
Various other camps and activities are held throughout the year. Film, music and athletic camps are held in Los Angeles. Every year an original film is produced by the participants and is premiered across the country to help raise funds for the camp. A sports camp takes place in Jensen Beach, Florida.

== Becoming Bulletproof ==
Becoming Bulletproof is Zeno Mountain Farm's first feature-length film that follows the making of a Western style movie by the Zeno participants. Director Michael Barnett was inspired to make the documentary after attending a film premiere and fundraiser for the camp three years prior to the project. Becoming Bulletproof provides insight into the struggles of film making, but its primary focus is on the cultivating of friendships between the actors, crew and other volunteers. It received critical acclaim with a Rotten Tomato score of 100%.

Becoming Bulletproof was nominated for a Satellite Award for Best Documentary Film.

== Best Summer Ever ==
Zeno Mountain Farm's second feature-length film, Best Summer Ever, was released 2020. It is the first movie musical to primarily stars actors with disabilities and the first Screen Actors Guild-registered movie in which more than half of the cast and crew have disabilities.

Best Summer Ever is a movie musical comedy with eight original songs. It stars Shannon DeVido, Ricky Wilson, Jr., Holly Palmer, Eileen Grubba, Madeline Rhodes (MuMu), Jacob Waltuck, Bradford Hayes, Emily Kranking, A.J. Murray, and Jeremy Vest with cameos from Maggie Gyllenhaal, Peter Sarsgaard, Benjamin Bratt (with his daughter Sophia), and Zack Gottsagen. With Jamie Lee Curtis, Ted Danson, Mary Steenburgen, Amy Brenneman and Dominique Dauwe serving as executive producers.

The film was set for its world premiere at the South by Southwest 2020 Film Festival until its cancellation due to the COVID-19 pandemic. On March 24, the film received the festival's "2020 Final Draft Screenwriters Award" for screenwriters Michael Parks Randa, Will Halby, Terra Mackintosh, Andrew Pilkington, and Lauren Smitelli. The film then screened virtually at the festival's 2021 edition on March 24, 2021. It also opened the 2021 ReelAbilities Film Festival on April 29, 2021, in its first physical New York-area screening at the Queens Drive-In in Flushing, New York.

The film currently streams on Hulu.
