= Zeno (name) =

Zeno is the common anglicised form of the name Zenon (Ancient Greek: Ζήνων), derived from the theonym Zeus. Other forms of the given name include Zénon (French) and Zenón (Spanish). The name is popular as a masculine given name in many Western countries, and it can also be found as a surname.

- Zeno (surname), a surname
- Zeno family, a Venetian family

== Given name ==
- Zeno Debast (born 2003), Belgian footballer
- Zeno Koo (born 1994), Hong Kong actor and singer
- Zeno Ibsen Rossi (born 2000), English footballer
- Zeno Robinson, American voice actor
- Zeno Roth (1956–2018), German musician

== Fictional characters ==
- Zeno, the Yellow Dragon Warrior in the manga Akatsuki no Yona: Yona of the Dawn
- Zen'ō, the supreme god of the multiverse in the anime and manga Dragon Ball Super
- Zeno Bell, a demon that uses spells in the anime Zatch Bell!
- Zeno Cosini, the protagonist of Italo Svevo's novel La Coscienza di Zeno
- Zeno Zoldyck, a character in the manga and anime series Hunter × Hunter
- Zeno, a secondary antagonist in Resident Evil Requiem
