= Flaming (Internet term) =

Act of insulting and offending people on the internet

Flaming is the act of posting insults, often including profanity or other offensive language, on the Internet. Flaming emerges from the anonymity that Internet forums provide for users, which allows them to act more aggressively. Anonymity can lead to disinhibition, which results in the swearing, offensive, and hostile language characteristic of flaming. Lack of social cues, less accountability of face-to-face communications, textual mediation, and deindividualization are also likely factors. Deliberate flaming is carried out by individuals known as flamers, which are specifically motivated to incite flaming. These users specialize in flaming and target specific aspects of a controversial conversation.

While these behaviors may be typical or expected in certain types of forums, they can have dramatic, adverse effects in others. Flame wars can have a lasting impact on some internet communities where even once a flame war has concluded a division or even dissolution may occur.

The individuals that create an environment of flaming and hostility lead the readers to disengage with the offender and may potentially leave the message board and chat room. The continual use of flaming within the online community can create a disruptive and negative experience for those involved and can lead to limited involvement and engagement within the original chat room and program.

== Purpose ==
Social researchers have investigated flaming, coming up with several different theories about the phenomenon. These include deindividuation and reduced awareness of other people's feelings (online disinhibition effect), conformance to perceived norms, miscommunication caused by the lack of social cues available in face-to-face communication, and anti-normative behavior.

Jay Wright Forrester, in discussing participants' internal modeling of a discussion, says:

Mental models are fuzzy, incomplete, and imprecisely stated. Furthermore, within a single individual, mental models change with time, even during the flow of a single conversation. The human mind assembles a few relationships to fit the context of a discussion. As debate shifts, so do the mental models. Even when only a single topic is being discussed, each participant in a conversation employs a different mental model to interpret the subject. Fundamental assumptions differ but are never brought into the open. Goals are different but left unstated. It is little wonder that compromise takes so long. And even when consensus is reached, the underlying assumptions may be fallacies that lead to laws and programs that fail. The human mind is not adapted to understanding correctly the consequences implied by a mental model. A mental model may be correct in structure and assumptions but, even so, the human mind—either individually or as a group consensus—is apt to draw the wrong implications for the future.

Thus, online conversations often involve a variety of assumptions and motives unique to each user. Without social context, users are often helpless to know the intentions of their counterparts. In addition to the problems of conflicting mental models often present in online discussions, the inherent lack of face-to-face communication online can encourage hostility. Professor Norman Johnson, commenting on the propensity of Internet posters to flame one another, states:

The literature suggests that, compared to face-to-face, the increased incidence of flaming when using computer-mediated communication is due to reductions in the transfer of social cues, which decrease individuals' concern for social evaluation and fear of social sanctions or reprisals. When social identity and ingroup status are salient, computer mediation can decrease flaming because individuals focus their attention on the social context (and associated norms) rather than themselves.

A lack of social context creates an element of anonymity, which allows users to feel insulated from the forms of punishment they might receive in a more conventional setting. Johnson identifies several precursors to flaming between users, whom he refers to as "negotiation partners," since Internet communication typically involves back-and-forth interactions similar to a negotiation. Flaming incidents usually arise in response to a perception of one or more negotiation partners being unfair. Perceived unfairness can include a lack of consideration for an individual's vested interests, unfavorable treatment (especially when the flamer has been considerate of other users), and misunderstandings aggravated by the inability to convey subtle indicators like non-verbal cues and facial expressions.

== Factors ==
There are multiple factors that play into why people would get involved with flaming. For instance, there is the anonymity factor and that people can use different means to have their identity hidden. Through the hiding of one's identity people can build a new persona and act in a way that they normally would not when they have their identity known. Another factor in flaming is proactive aggression "which is initiated without perceived threat or provocation" and those who are recipients of flaming may counter with flaming of their own and utilize reactive aggression. Another factor that goes into flaming is the different communication variables. For instance, offline communications networks can impact the way people act online and can lead them to engage in flaming. Finally, there is the factor of verbal aggression and how people who engage in verbal aggression will use those tactics when they engage in flaming online.

Flaming can range from subtle to extremely aggressive in online behaviors, such as derogatory images, certain emojis used in combination, and even the use of capital letters. These things can show a pattern of behavior used to convey certain emotions online. Victims should do their best to avoid fighting back in an attempt to prevent a war of words. Flaming extends past social media interactions. Flaming can also take place through emails, and whether someone calls an email a "flame" is based on whether she or he considers an email to be hostile, aggressive, insulting, or offensive. What matters is how the person receives the interaction. So much is lost in translation when communicating online versus in person, that it is hard to distinguish someone's intent.

== History ==
Evidence of debates that resulted in insults being exchanged quickly back and forth between two parties can be found throughout history. Arguments over the ratification of the United States Constitution were often socially and emotionally heated and intense, with many attacking one another through local newspapers. Such interactions have always been part of literary criticism. For example, Ralph Waldo Emerson's contempt for Jane Austen's works often extended to the author herself, with Emerson describing her as "without genius, wit, or knowledge of the world". In turn, Thomas Carlyle called Emerson a "hoary-headed toothless baboon".

In the modern era, "flaming" was used at East Coast engineering schools in the United States as a present participle in a crude expression to describe an irascible individual and by extension to such individuals on the earliest Internet chat rooms and message boards. Internet flaming was mostly observed in Usenet newsgroups although it was known to occur in the WWIVnet and FidoNet computer networks as well. It was subsequently used in other parts of speech with much the same meaning.

The term "flaming" was seen on Usenet newsgroups in the Eighties, where the start of a flame was sometimes indicated by typing "FLAME ON", then "FLAME OFF" when the flame section of the post was complete. This is a reference to both the Human Torch of the Fantastic Four, who used those words when activating his flame abilities, and to the way text processing programs of the time worked, by placing commands before and after text to indicate how it should appear when printed.

The term "flaming" is documented in The Hacker's Dictionary, which in 1983 defined it as "to speak rabidly or incessantly on an uninteresting topic or with a patently ridiculous attitude". The meaning of the word has diverged from this definition since then.

Jerry Pournelle in 1986 explained why he wanted a kill file for BIX:

...whereas an open computer conference begins with a small number of well-informed and highly interested participants, it soon attracts others. That's all right; it's supposed to attract others. Where else would you get new ideas? But soon it attracts too many, far too many, and some of them are not only ignorant but aggressively misinformed. Dilution takes place. Arguments replace discussions. Tempers are frayed. The result is that while computer conferencing began by saving time, it starts to eat up all the time it saved and more. Communications come from dozens of sources. Much of it is redundant. Some of it is stupid. The user spends more and more time dealing with irrelevancies. One day the user wakes up, decides the initial euphoria was spurious, and logs off, never to return. This is known as burnout, and it's apparently quite common.

He added, "I noticed something: most of the irritation came from a handful of people, sometimes only one or two. If I could only ignore them, the computer conferences were still valuable. Alas, it's not always easy to do".

Computer-mediated communication (CMC) research has spent a significant amount of time and effort describing and predicting engagement in uncivil, aggressive online communication. Specifically, the literature has described aggressive, insulting behavior as "flaming", which has been defined as hostile verbal behaviors, the uninhibited expression of hostility, insults, and ridicule, and hostile comments directed towards a person or organization within the context of CMC.

In the 21st century, flaming is frequently observed in digital communication spaces like social media platforms and online chat rooms. Flaming is especially common in comment sections on media-sharing platforms including YouTube. Due to its significant frequency in the early days of social media comment sharing, flaming is associated with the origins of hate commenting. Social media flaming has strong connections with cyberbullying: a form of bullying in which victims are attacked using digital means. This can create toxic environments that encourage targeted users to abandon social media.

=== 21st-century evaluations and evolution ===
Flaming is often considered a synonym of internet trolling. However, the frequent use of both terms from the late 1990s to 2010s has led some internet culture researchers to develop unique definitions for each word. In most cases, internet trolls deliberately post offensive and inflammatory remarks in hopes of creating conflict or chaos amongst those they target. This typically means that internet trolls are not emotionally invested in the person or topic that their trolling relates to. Flame trolling and flamebait are closely associated with this kind of online behavior.

An academic definition of flaming has not been established in the way that one for trolling has. Of the variety of published definitions, many are too broad to be applied to just one word. In Peter J. Moor's 2010 study concerning flaming on YouTube, some participants reported their lack of understanding of flaming's definition. Some experts have called for the disuse of the term in scholarly contexts. In her 2006 article "What is your claim to flame", current Professor and Chair of Critical Studies at California College of the Arts Patricia G. Lange wrote that "'flaming' is an oversaturated term that ignores the interactional nature of both flames and flame claims." Norman Johnson's idea that flaming may be a result of perceived unfairness between "negotiation partners" suggests that, unlike trolls, flamers are emotionally invested in the person or topic that their flaming pertains to.

In the mid-2020s, "rage bait" or "ragebait" became popular terms amongst internet users to describe behavior similar to trolling. Like trolling, flame trolling, and flamebait, rage bait is utilized to purposefully incite anger and frustration in victims. Considering Norman Johnson's assessment that flaming is rooted in emotional investment, those who fall victim to rage bait and trolling may become flamers when responding to such provocative comments and content.

== Types ==
=== Flame trolling ===
Flame trolling is the posting of a provocative or offensive message, known as flamebait, to a public Internet discussion group, such as a forum, newsgroup, or mailing list, with the intent of provoking an angry response (a "flame") or argument.

Flamebait can provide the poster with a controlled trigger-and-response setting in which to anonymously engage in conflicts and indulge in aggressive behavior without facing the consequences that such behavior might bring in a face-to-face encounter. In other instances, flamebait may be used to reduce a forum's use by angering the forum users. In 2012, it was announced that the US State Department would start flame trolling jihadists as part of Operation Viral Peace.

Among the characteristics of inflammatory behavior, the use of entirely capitalized messages, or the multiple repetition of exclamation marks, along with profanity have been identified as typical.

=== Flame war ===
A flame war results when multiple users engage in provocative responses to an original post, which is sometimes flamebait. Flame wars often draw in many users, including those trying to defuse the flame war, and can quickly turn into a mass flame war that overshadows regular forum discussion.

Resolving a flame war can be difficult, as it is often hard to determine who is really responsible for the degradation of a reasonable discussion into a flame war. Someone who posts a contrary opinion in a strongly focused discussion forum may be easily labeled a "baiter", "flamer", or "troll".

Flame wars can become intense and can include "death threats, ad hominem invective, and textual amplifiers," but to some sociologists flame wars can actually bring people together. What is being said in a flame war should not be taken too seriously since the harsh words are a part of flaming.

An approach to resolving a flame war or responding to flaming is to communicate openly with the offending users. Acknowledging mistakes, offering to help resolve the disagreement, making clear, reasoned arguments, and even self-deprecation have all been noted as worthwhile strategies to end such disputes. However, others prefer to simply ignore flaming, noting that, in many cases, if the flamebait receives no attention, it will quickly be forgotten as forum discussions carry on. Unfortunately, this can motivate trolls to intensify their activities, creating additional distractions.

"Taking the bait" or "feeding the troll" refers to someone who responds to the original message regardless of whether they are aware the original message was intended to provoke a response. Often when someone takes the bait, others will point this out to them with the acronym "YHBT", which is short for "You have been trolled", or reply with "don't feed the trolls". Forum users will usually not give the troll acknowledgment; that just "feeds the troll".

=== Political flaming ===
Political flaming typically occurs when people have their views challenged and they seek to have their anger known. Through the covering of one's identity people may be more likely to engage in political flaming. In a 2015 study conducted by Hutchens, Cicchirillo, and Hmielowski, they found that "those who were more experienced with political discussions—either online or offline—were more likely to indicate they would respond with a flame", and they also found that verbal aggression also played a role in a person engaging in political flaming. Internet flaming has also contributed to pushing some politicians out of their field, including Kari Kjønaas Kjos of the Norwegian Progress Party, who elected to leave politics in April of 2020 due to hostility she was experiencing online.

=== Corporate flaming ===
Corporate flaming is when a large number of critical comments, usually aggressive or insulting, are directed at a company's employees, products, or brands. Common causes include inappropriate behavior of company employees, negative customer experiences, inadequate care of customers and influencers, violation of ethical principles, apparent injustices, and inappropriate reactions. Flame wars can result in reputational damage, decreased consumer confidence, drops in stock prices and company assets, increased liabilities, increased lawsuits, and a decrease in customers, influencers, and sponsors. Based on an assessment of the damage, companies can take years to recover from a flame war that may detract from their core purpose. Kayser notes that companies should prepare for possible flame wars by creating alerts for a predefined "blacklist" of words and monitoring fast-growing topics about their company. Alternatively, Kayser points out that a flame war can lead to a positive experience for the company. Based on the content, it could be shared across multiple platforms and increase company recognition, social media fans/followers, brand presence, purchases, and brand loyalty. Therefore, the type of marketing that results from a flame war can lead to higher profits and brand recognition on a broader scale. Nevertheless, it is encouraged that when a company utilizes social media they should be aware that their content could be used in a flame war and should be treated as an emergency.

=== Non-verbal flaming ===
A defining aspect of digital interaction is the multitude non-verbal communication methods that it offers. Emoticons, and later emojis, have been associated with internet flaming since the 1990s. Due to their non-standardized usage, emoticons and emojis can be incredibly difficult to correctly interpret in online communication. This further amplifies the loss of face-to-face conversational context that is experienced when digital communication is utilized. A 1996 study found that the inclusion of friendly emoticons in hateful and insulting digital messages did not change the recipient's negative interpretation of the communication. The use of emoticons and emojis in this context is an example of sarcasm, a commonly identified characteristic of flaming.

The rise of live-streaming platforms in the late 2000s and early 2010s established a new setting for the use of non-verbal flaming. Twitch's "emote" feature allows live-stream viewers to upload both universal and customizable, creator-specific images and emojis to live chats. Because live-stream chats occur in real time, viewer messages contain less context and are typically shorter than those in other digital mediums that rely on earlier conversation. The real-time nature of live-stream chats makes automated moderation services far less effective than they typically are. A 2023 study found that live chat moderation events were almost always triggered by comments that explicitly violated the platform's terms of service. To bypass this kind of enforcement, flamers and trolls often utilize emojis, emoticons, and emotes to pester streamers instead of verbal text.

== Examples ==
Any subject of a polarizing nature can feasibly cause flaming. As one would expect in the medium of the Internet, technology is a common topic. The perennial debates between users of competing operating systems, such as Windows, Classic Mac OS and macOS operating system, or operating systems based on the Linux kernel and iOS or Android operating system, users of Intel and AMD processors, and users of the Nintendo Switch, Wii U, PlayStation 4 and Xbox One video game systems, often escalate into seemingly unending "flame wars", also called software wars. As each successive technology is released, it develops its own outspoken fan base, allowing arguments to begin anew.

Popular culture continues to generate large amounts of flaming and countless flame wars across the Internet, such as the constant debates between fans of Star Trek and Star Wars. Ongoing discussion of current celebrities and television personalities within popular culture also frequently sparks debate.

In 2005, author Anne Rice became involved in a flame war of sorts on the review boards of online retailer Amazon.com after several reviewers posted scathing comments about her latest novel. Rice responded to the comments with her own lengthy response, which was quickly met with more feedback from users.

In 2007, tech expert Kathy Sierra was a victim of flaming as an image of her depicted as a mutilated body was spread around online forums. In addition to the doctored photo being spread virally, her social security number and home address were made public as well. Consequently, Sierra effectively gave up her technology career in response to the ensuing harassment and threats that she received as a result of the flaming.

In November 2007, the popular audio-visual discussion site AVS Forum temporarily closed its HD DVD and Blu-ray discussion forums because of, as the site reported, "physical threats that have involved police and possible legal action" between advocates of the rival formats.

The 2016 Presidential election saw a flame war take place between Republican candidate Donald Trump and the Democratic candidate Hillary Clinton. The barbs exchanged between the two were highly publicized in an example of political flaming and a flame war. Similar messages were shared leading up to the 2024 Presidential election, with Donald Trump referring to his opponent, Kamala Harris, as "Lyin' Kamala," and the incumbent, Joe Biden, as "Crooked Joe Biden" on his X account.

== Legal implications ==
Flaming varies in severity and as such so too does the reaction of states in imposing any sort of sanction. Laws vary from country to country. In most cases, constant flaming can be considered cyber harassment, which can result in Internet service provider action to prevent access to the site being flamed. However, as social networks become more and more closely connected to people and their real lives, the more harsh words may be considered defamation of the person. For instance, a South Korean identity verification law was created to help control flaming and to stop "malicious use of the internet" but opponents to the law argue that the law infringes on the right to free speech.

== See also ==
- Cyberbullying – Bullying in electronic communications
- Dogpiling – Form of online harassment
- Eristic – Argumentation for the sake of winning the argument instead of reaching or seeking truth
- Forumwarz – 2008 video game
- Godwin's law – Internet adage about Nazi comparisons
- "It's okay to be white – Slogan associated with white supremacy"
- Meow Wars – Early example of a flame war sent over Usenet
- Smack talk – Form of boast or insult commonly heard in competitive situations
- Social software – Type of software
- Spiral of silence on the Internet – Political science and mass communication theory
