= Zenone =

Zenone may refer to:

- Zenone, an Italian Catholic saint
- Zenone Benini (1902–1976), Italian industrialist and Fascist politician
- Zenone Veronese, an Italian painter of the Renaissance period

== See also ==
- Zeno (disambiguation)
- Zenon (disambiguation)
- San Zenone (disambiguation)
