= ARMM (Usenet) =

Moderation software

Automated Retroactive Minimal Moderation (ARMM) was a program developed by Richard Depew in 1993 to aid in the control of Usenet abuse. Concerned by abusive posts emanating from certain anonymous-posting sites, Depew developed ARMM to allow news administrators to automatically issue cancel messages for such posts. This was a controversial act, as many news administrators and users were concerned about censorship of the netnews medium.

An early version of ARMM contained a bug which caused it to post follow-ups to its own messages, recursively sending posts to the news.admin.policy newsgroup. This was an early example of (unintentional) Usenet spam.
