= Serdar Argic =

Turkish spammer and Armenian Genocide denier

Serdar Argic (Turkish: Serdar Argıç) was the alias used in one of the first automated newsgroup spam incidents on Usenet, with the objective of denying the Armenian genocide.

== Usenet posts ==
For a period of several months in the first half of 1994, the Internet user under the pseudonym of "Serdar Argic" (with "sera" Usenet ID) posted messages in any Usenet newsgroup thread involving the country of Turkey, arguing that the Armenian genocide had not occurred or that Armenians had committed genocide against Turks. Describing him in Net.wars, Wendy Grossman said:

Serdar Argic, who apparently managed to run a daily search on all of Usenet for mentions of Turkey, and followed up all such messages with lengthy and historically inaccurate diatribes about genocide against the Turks.

Argic's postings soon numbered in the tens of thousands, and averaged over 100 posts per day, the highest post count of any single Usenet entity at the time. He posted to several newsgroups, especially soc.history, soc.culture.Turkish, and misc.headlines. Because of the posting volume, repetitiveness and minimal responsiveness to follow-up posts, most observers concluded that it was the output of a program, or "bot", which scanned for any new appearances of the keywords "Turkey" or "Armenia" in certain newsgroups and replied with saved pages of political text. The bot would automatically post a reply even if the original message had simply mentioned a Thanksgiving turkey but was cross-posted to a soc.* group. The posts sometimes contained direct responses to specific statements, indicating some human intervention.

=== Response ===
Internet users sent complaints to UUNET, the Internet service provider hosting the account of Serdar Argic. UUNET never took any action based on the complaints, since Serdar Argic was posting from a host downstream from the host they fed (anatolia!zuma) over which they had no control. Serdar Argic became known as the Zumabot due to the name of his host.

Usenet messages can be cancelled, which prevents their further propagation. However, at the time, there was a fear of the free use of third-party cancellations, as it was felt they could set a precedent for the cancellation of posts by anyone simply disagreeing with the messages. Cancellations were rarely performed at the time, because spam was not the problem it became in subsequent years.

The Serdar Argic posts stopped in April 1994, after UUNET cancelled the subscription of anatolia.

== Popular culture ==
Ken MacLeod referred to Argic in his novel The Star Fraction as a slang term for "the lowest layer of paranoid drivel that infested the Cable, spun out by degenerate, bug-ridden, knee-jerk auto-post programs. Kill-file clutter." In his novel Accelerando, Charles Stross describes one character as "a kind of Serdar Argic of intellectual property."

== See also ==
- List of spammers
