= Voyage of the Zeno brothers =

Purported 14th century sea voyage

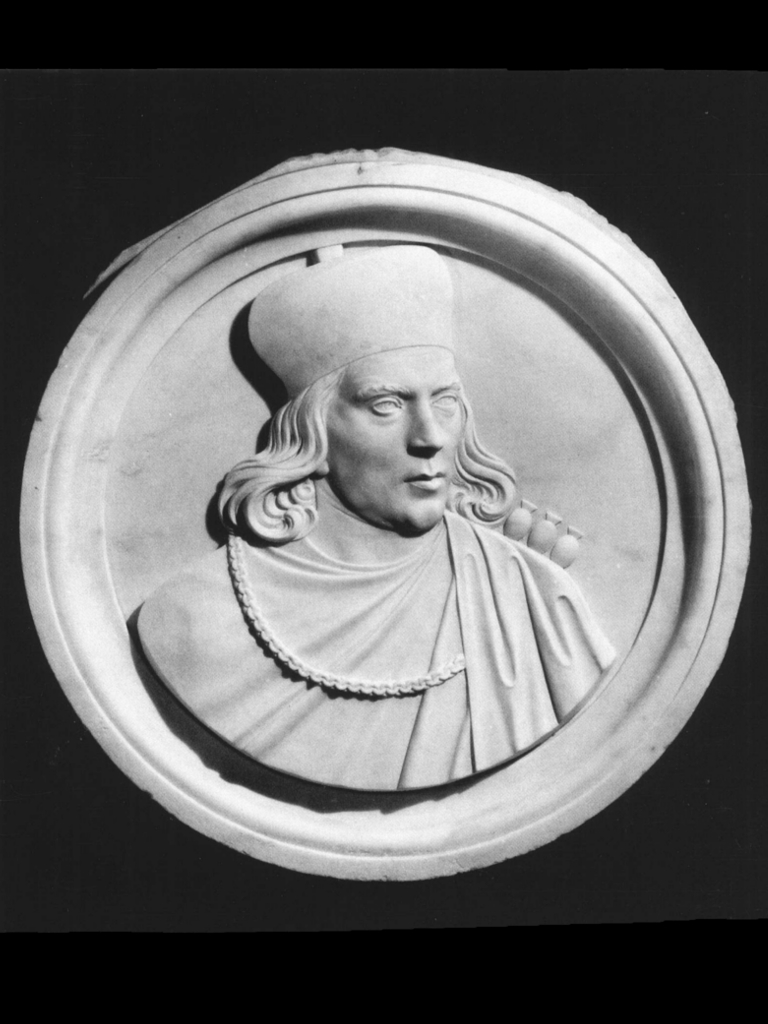
Nicolò Zeno, by Antonio Bianchi (1858–1861)

The Zeno brothers, Nicolò (c. 1326 – c. 1402) and Antonio (died c. 1403), were Italian noblemen from the Republic of Venice who lived during the 14th century. They became well known in 1558, when their descendant, Nicolò Zeno the Younger, published a map and a series of letters purporting to describe an exploration made by the brothers of the north Atlantic and Arctic waters during the 1390s. The younger Nicolò claimed the documents were discovered in a storeroom of his family home.

Widely accepted at the time of publication, the map was incorporated into the works of major cartographers, including Gerardus Mercator. Modern historians and geographers have disputed the veracity of the map and the described voyages, with some accusing the younger Zeno of forgery.

Nicolò and Antonio were brothers of the Venetian naval hero Carlo Zeno. The Zeno family was an established part of the aristocracy of Venice and had the franchise for transportation between Venice and the Holy Land during the Crusades. According to the younger Zeno, the map and letters date from about the year 1400 and describe a long voyage made by the Zeno brothers during the 1390s by the direction of a prince named Zichmni. Supporters of a legend involving the contemporaneous Scottish nobleman Henry Sinclair, Earl of Orkney suggest that Zichmni is a mistranscription of d’Orkney. The voyage supposedly traversed the North Atlantic and, according to some interpretations, reached North America nearly a century before the voyages of Christopher Columbus.

== Alleged voyage ==
Nicolò and Antonio are notable for a number of letters and a map (the so-called "Zeno map") published in the year 1558 by one of their descendants, also named Nicolò Zeno. The letters, written allegedly by the brothers about 1400, describe a voyage of exploration that they say they made throughout the North Atlantic (and, by some interpretations, to North America) by command of a prince named Zichmni (whom some have identified as Henry Sinclair). Some commentators have suggested that a descendant, William Sinclair (c. 1404 – c. 1484), the builder of Rosslyn Chapel, had knowledge of Henry Sinclair's involvement with the Zeno brothers and had decorated the interior of the chapel with carvings of plants discovered during the voyage. This claim of "proof" that the voyage occurred has been discredited.

The letters and accompanying map are controversial and are regarded by at least one historian as a hoax, perpetrated either by the Zeno brothers themselves or by their descendant who wrote a narrative which he said was based on what was left of letters that he had torn apart as a boy. In 1989, Italian scholar Giorgio Padoan published a study influenced by Pohl's belief that Sinclair went West in 1398, suggesting that there is some authenticity in their travels and stated correctly that Nicolò is not to be found in any document between the years 1396–1400 (so he could have been at least in Iceland).

== The letters ==
The letters are divided into two parts. The first part contains letters from Nicolò to Antonio. The second part consists of letters from Antonio to their brother Carlo.

The first letters (from Nicolò to Antonio) tell how Nicolò began in 1380 a voyage from Venice to England and Flanders. Evidence exists that such a voyage occurred, and that Nicolò returned to Venice around 1385.

In the letters, Nicolò describes being stranded on an island between Great Britain and Iceland named Frislanda, which is described as being larger in size than Ireland. By chance Nicolò is rescued by Zichmni, who is described as a prince who owned some islands named Porlanda off the southern coast of Frislanda, and who ruled the duchy of Sorant, or Sorand, southeast of Frislanda. It has been suggested that Frislanda is in fact a stand-in for the Faroe Islands, with individual islands merged mistakenly into a single landmass by Nicolò the younger, although Frisland and the Faroe Islands appear together on several maps, many hundreds of miles apart.

Nicolò invites Antonio to come to Frislanda with him, which he does, staying for fourteen years. By Zichmni's direction, Antonio attacks "Estlanda" (ostensibly the Shetland Islands or a neighbouring island, as indicated by similarities between placenames mentioned in the letters). Zichmni then attempts to attack "Islanda" (Likely Shetland conflated with the name of Iceland). After finding it too well-defended, he attacks seven islands along its eastern side: Bres, Talas, Broas, Iscant, Trans, Mimant, and Damberc. All of these islands are fictitious. An alternative interpretation finds that in transcribing the letters the Zeno brothers' descendant mistook a reference to "Estlanda" for "Islanda" or Iceland, thus accounting for both the presence of those superfluous islands off Iceland and the mysterious absence of an equal number of islands off of the Shetland Islands. Further evidence in support of this claim is the similarity of placenames in the Zenos' "Islanda" to placenames in modern‐day Shetland, for instance the island of Bressay for "Bres", and Danaberg sound near Lerwick for "Damberc".

Zichmni then builds a fort on Bres and leaves Nicolò in charge of it. Nicolò makes a voyage to Greenland and finds a monastery with central heating. According to the alternative interpretation cited above, in which the travellers had yet to leave Estlanda, the subsequent destination is in fact Iceland, explaining the presence of geothermal heating and other observations.

Zichmni receives word that a group of lost fishermen from Frislanda have returned after an absence of over twenty-five years. The fishermen describe making landfall in the far west in unknown countries named Estotiland and Drogeo. They claim to have encountered strange animals as well as cannibals, from whom they escaped only after teaching the cannibals how to fish. Inspired by the tales of the fishermen, Zichmni voyages to the west with Antonio in charge of his fleet. To the west of Frislanda (see the Zeno map), they encounter a large island named Icaria, which does not exist.

According to the letters, the inhabitants of Icaria greet them before they can make landfall. Only one person among the Icarians is able to speak a language that Zichmni understands. The inhabitants state that visitors to the island are not welcome and that they will defend the island to the last man if need be. Zichmni sails along the island looking for a place to make landfall, but the inhabitants chase him and Zichmni abandons the effort.

Sailing west, they make landfall at a promontory named Trin on the southern tip of "Engrouelanda". Zichmni likes the climate and the soil, but his crew find it inhospitable. The sailors return home with Antonio, while Zichmni stays to explore the area and build a town.

== The map ==
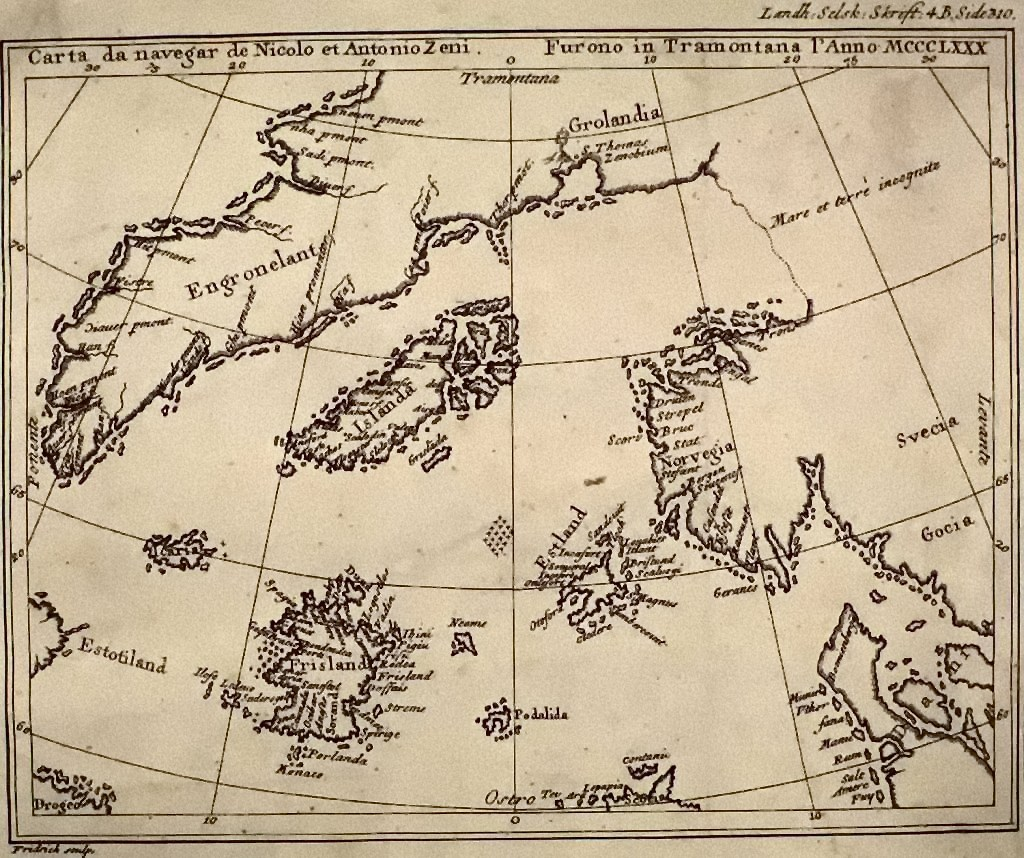
A reproduction of the Zeno map from a 1793 book.

=== Phantom islands ===
==== Estotiland ====
"Estotiland" appears on the Zeno map ostensibly on the western side of the Atlantic Ocean, in the approximate location of what is now termed Labrador, on the northeast coast of North America. Its description matches one given by Benedetto Bordone of 1528 Mexico. It is one of the sources for the Russian "Estoty", featured in Vladimir Nabokov's Ada.

==== Frisland ====
"Frisland" appeared on virtually all maps of the North Atlantic from the 1560s to the 1660s. It is not to be confused with the similarly named Friesland in the Netherlands, nor the two Frieslands (East and North) in Germany. The placename originally referred to Iceland ("Freezeland"), but after the Zeno map placed it as an entirely separate island south (or occasionally southwest) of Iceland, it appeared that way on maps for the next 100 years.

=== Other islands ===
"Islanda" is clearly Iceland. "Estland" is presumed to be Shetland, with various placenames recognisable as belonging to that island group. It has been tentatively suggested that "Podalida" is a corruption of Pomona, a historical name for Mainland, Orkney. "Icaria", or "Caria" if the initial "I" means "Island", has been suggested as a misplaced Kerry or Kilda, but may simply be an invention of the mapmaker. "Neome" has been identified as Fair Isle or Foula.

== Controversy and criticism ==
The account of the voyages given by the younger Nicolò continues to be the subject of debate. Some of the islands the Zeno brothers allegedly visited either conflate existing locations or do not exist at all. Research has shown that the Zeno brothers were occupied elsewhere when they were supposedly doing their exploring. Contemporary Venetian court documents place Nicolò as undergoing trial for embezzlement in 1394 for his actions as military governor of Modone and Corone in Greece from 1390–1392. He wrote his last will and testament in Venice in 1400, years after his alleged death in Frislanda about 1394. There is disagreement about the brothers' whereabouts at the time of the supposed voyages, with some readings of archival records placing the brothers in Venice at that time.

According to The Dictionary of Canadian Biography Online, "the Zeno affair remains one of the most preposterous and at the same time one of the most successful fabrications in the history of exploration." Herbert Wrigley Wilson described and analysed the story at length in The Royal Navy, a History from the Earliest Times to the Present, and was sceptical about its veracity, noting "At the date when the work was published Venice was extremely eager to claim for herself some share in the credit of Columbus's discoveries as against her old rival Genoa, from whom Columbus had sprung."

=== Modern views ===
Most historians regard the map and accompanying narrative as a hoax, perpetrated by the younger Zeno to make a retroactive claim for Venice as having discovered the New World before Christopher Columbus.

The evidence against the authenticity of the map is based largely on the appearance of many phantom islands in the North Atlantic and off the coast of Iceland. One of these non-existent islands was Frisland, where the Zeno brothers allegedly spent some time.

In the book "Land of Silence" written by Clements Markham and published posthumously in 1921, he wrote:

"Most of the names on the Zeno map were supposed to be original; due to their discoveries, and not existent on any earlier map. The discovery of these earlier medieval maps, however, has disposed of that delusion. Of the 19 Zeno names on Iceland, 12 are in the Zamoiski map, 3 in the Florence map, and the others in that of Olaus Magnus. On the Cantino map in 1502 appears Frisland, placed due north of Scotland. It is a clerical error in copying Stillanda from the Cosa map. This is the way Zeno got hold of the name Frislanda. The whole was concocted by Niccolo Zeno and his publisher Marcoloni in 1558, from materials on maps then existing.. The Zeno imposture was first studied by Professor Storm, in the light of the Zamoiski and Olaus Magnus maps, and he exposed the falsities of the narrative, and the imposture of the map. The whole subject was discussed in an exhaustive work bv Mr F. W. Lucas, from which the above details have been taken. The mischief done by the Zeno forgery, while it lasted, was very serious; causing confusion in the work of cartographers as well as mistakes in the reports of navigators.

Current scholarship regards the map as being based on existing maps of the 16th century, in particular:

- The Olaus Magnus map of the North, the Carta marina
- The Caerte van Oostlant of Cornelis Anthoniszoon
- Claudius Clavus-type maps of the North

== Sources ==
- Cooper, Robert L. D. (Ed.) The Voyages of the Venetian Brothers Nicolo & Antonion Zeno to the Northern Seas in the XIVth Century. Masonic Publishing Co. 2004. ISBN 0-9544268-2-7.
- Di Robilant, Andrea. Irresistible North: From Venice to Greenland on the Trail of the Zen Brothers. Publisher Alfred A. Knopf. New York, 2011 ISBN 030726985X
- Horodowich, Elizabeth (Fall 2014). "Venetians in America: Nicolò Zen and the Virtual Exploration of the New World". Renaissance Quarterly. 67 (3): 841–877. doi:10.1086/678776. S2CID 163622442.
- Morison, Samuel Eliot (1971). The European Discovery of America: The Northern Voyages. University of Oxford Press. pp. 87–89, 107–108.
- Smith, Brian. Earl Henry Sinclair's fictitious trip to America. New Orkney Antiquarian Journal, vol 2., 2002
