= HipCrime =

HipCrime was both the screenname of a Usenet user and a software application distributed by, and presumably written by, this individual or group. The name derives from a neologism in the John Brunner science fiction novel Stand on Zanzibar.

== HipCrime's Newsagent ==
HipCrime's Newsagent
- Written in: Java
- Type: Usenet control client

HipCrime's Newsagent software is a free and open-source Usenet control client. The program is written in Java and allows the user to auto-cancel any messages on Usenet based on author, subject, organization, message-ID, or path. It also allows the user to replace the body of any message with text of their choosing. The software also monitors any posts you choose and reposts them if they are removed. Additionally, it allows regular users to act as Usenet Administrators and create (or remove) entire newsgroups.

CA Inc. has classified this as denial of service software, as well as flooder software, a specific type of denial of service attack.

== HipCrime's ActiveAgent ==
HipCrime's ActiveAgent
- Written in: Java
- Type: E-mail spam

HipCrime is referred to as "a leading Usenet Terrorist" by James Farmer, maintainer of Spamfaq: Part 3: Understanding NANAE.

Andrew Leonard, in his book Bots: The Origin of New Species, also credits HipCrime with creating the earliest web-distributed spambot. This bot, known as HipCrime's ActiveAgent, was a Java applet which allowed anybody with a web browser to send mass volumes of unsolicited e-mail messages. The ActiveAgent has since been expanded into an open-source application (known as MarketCom's MktAgent) and is relied upon heavily by the largest e-mail spam stock pump and dump gangs.

== See also ==
- List of spammers
