= StuffIt Expander =

File decompressor software utility

- Developer: Smith Micro Software
- Stable release: 16.2 / December 21, 2020
- Operating system: Classic Mac OS, macOS, Windows
- Type: File Extractor/Decompressor
- License: Freeware
- Website: Stuffit Homepage

StuffIt Expander is a proprietary, freeware, closed source, decompression software utility developed by Allume Systems (a subsidiary of Smith Micro Software formerly known as Aladdin Systems). It runs on the classic Mac OS, macOS, and Windows. Prior to 2011, a Linux version had also been available for download.

The latest version for each Mac platform is as follows:

- 16.2 for OS X 10.11+ (as of December 2020);
- 16.0.5 for Mac OS X 10.8+;
- 15.0.7 (2011) for Mac OS X 10.6.8+;
- 15.0.4 (2011) for Mac OS X 10.5+;
- 14.0.1 (2010) for Mac OS X 10.4+;
- 10.0.2 for Mac OS X 10.3+;
- 8.0.2 for Mac OS X 10.0+;
- 7.0.3 for Mac OS 8.6+;
- 6.0.1 for Mac OS 8.1+ (PowerPC only);
- 5.5.1 for System 7.1+ (68020 and up, PowerPC);
- 4.5 for System 6+ (compatible with all 68k processors).

StuffIt has been a target of criticism and dissatisfaction from Mac users in the past as the file format changes frequently, notably during the introduction of StuffIt version 5.0. Expander 5.0 contained many bugs, and its file format was not readable by the earlier version 4.5, leaving Mac users of the time without a viable compression utility.

The latest stand-alone version for Windows is 2011 (15.0). Unlike the version before it (12.0), which was only able to decompress the newer .sitx (and ZIP) archives, version 2009 claims to be able to decompress over 30 formats, some listed below. The executables require both, the .NET v2.0 framework and MSVC 2008 (9.0) runtimes. The previous stand-alone version able to decompress .sit and other classic Mac OS-specific archives was 7.02, distributed with StuffIt v7.0.x for Windows.

From versions 7.5.x to 11 the Expander capabilities were actually performed by the StuffIt Standard Edition, that allowed decompression even after the end of the trial period. To start StuffIt in Expander mode the following command line switches were used: -expand -uiexpander. Note that the registration reminder dialogue box is not shown in this case. With older versions of StuffIt Expander on the classic Mac OS platform, such as StuffIt Expander 3.5, it was possible to enhance the capabilities of StuffIt Expander and to add support for decompressing additional archive formats by means of the shareware DropStuff with Expander Enhancer software from Aladdin Systems.

An official MS-DOS command line program, UNSTUFF v1.1, can decompress .sit files.

StuffIt Expander 2009 decompresses files in the following formats:

- 7-Zip (.7z, .cb7)
- AppleSingle (.as)
- Arc (.arc)
- ARJ (.arj)
- BinHex (.hqx), all versions
- BTOA (.b2a, .btoa)
- bzip2 (.bzip, .bzip2, .bz, .bz2, .tbz, .tbz2, .tar.bz, .tar.bz2)
- CAB (.cab)
- Compact Pro (.cpt)
- gzip (.gz, .tgz)
- LHA (.lha, .lzh)
- LZMA (.lzma, .tlzma, .tar.lzma)
- MacBinary (.bin, .macbin), all versions
- MIME/Base 64 (.mime)
- Private File (.pF), Aladdin's encryption file format
- RAR (.rar, .rNN, .cbr, .partNN.rar), including segmented
- SpaceSaver StuffIt compression format used in versions prior 5.x
- StuffIt (.sit, .sitx, .sit.N, .partNN.sitx, .sea, .exe) v1.5.1 to 8.0.x, including encrypted, segmented and self-extracting archive (Classic Mac OS file type code 'SIT!')
- tar (.tar, .gtar, .gnutar, .ustar, .cbt)
- Unix Compress (.Z, .z, .taz)
- UU (.uu, .uue, .enc), PC/Unix 8 bit to 7 bit encoding similar to BinHex (.hqx)
- yEncode (.ync, .y)
- ZIP (.zip, .zNN, .cbz, .exe), including encrypted, Zip64, segmented and self-extracting archive
