= Email attachment =

Computer file sent along with an email

An email attachment is a computer file sent along with an email message. One or more files can be attached to any email message, and be sent along with it to the recipient. This is typically used as a simple method to share documents and images.

== History, and technical detail ==
Originally, ARPANET, UUCP, and Internet SMTP email allowed 7-bit ASCII text only. Text files were emailed by including them in the message body. In the mid 1980s text files could be grouped with UNIX tools such as bundle and shar (shell archive) and included in email message bodies, allowing them to be unpacked on remote UNIX systems with a single shell command.

The COMSYS/MSGDMS system at MIT offered "Enclosures" beginning by 1976. Users inside COMSYS could receive the enclosure file directly. Messages sent to users out of the COMSYS world sent the enclosure as part of the message body, which was useful only for text files.

Attaching non-text files was first accomplished in 1980 by manually encoding 8-bit files using Mary Ann Horton's uuencode, and later using BinHex or xxencode and pasting the resulting text into the body of the message. When the "Attachment" user interface first appeared on PCs in cc:Mail around 1985, it used the uuencode format for SMTP transmission, as did Microsoft Mail later.

Modern email systems use the MIME standard, making email attachments more utilitarian and seamless. This was developed by Nathaniel Borenstein and collaborator Ned Freed, with the standard being officially released as RFC2045 in 1996.

With MIME, a message and all its attachments are encapsulated in a single multipart message, with base64 encoding used to convert binary into 7-bit ASCII text; or, on some modern mail servers, optionally full 8-bit support via the 8BITMIME extension.

== Size limits ==
Email standards such as MIME do not specify any file size limits, but in practice, email users will find that they cannot successfully send very large files across the Internet.

This is because of a number of potential limits:

- Mail systems often arbitrarily limit the size their users are allowed to submit.
- A message will often pass through several mail transfer agents to reach the recipient. Each of these has to store the message before forwarding it on, and may therefore also impose size limits.
- The recipient mail system may reject incoming emails with attachments over a certain size.

The result is that while large attachments may succeed internally within a company or organization, they may not when sending across the Internet.

As an example, when Google's Gmail service increased its arbitrary limit to 25MB it warned that: "you may not be able to send larger attachments to contacts who use other email services with smaller attachment limits".

Also note that all these size limits are based, not on the original file size, but the MIME-encoded copy. The common Base64 encoding adds about 37% to the original file size, meaning that an original 20MB file could exceed a 25MB file attachment limit. A 10MB email size limit would require that the size of the attachment files is actually limited to about 7MB.

Users should be cautious with certain file formats when received as email attachments, such as .zip and .tgz files, because they can contain harmful viruses and potential software. .iso files can also be used to spread malware and .exe is an executable file that can become active on a computer as soon as it is opened.

== Malware ==
A lot of malware is distributed via email attachments with some even considering such to be the main vector for cyberattacks on businesses. Users are advised to be extremely cautious with attachments and to not open any attachments that are not from a trusted source and expected − even if the sender is in their address book as their account might have been taken over or misused. While many email servers scan attachments for malware and block dangerous filetypes, this should not be relied upon − especially as such cannot detect zero-day exploits.

=== Dangerous file types ===
Email users are typically warned that unexpected email with attachments should always be considered suspicious and dangerous, particularly if not known to be sent by a trusted source. However, in practice this advice is not enough – "known trusted sources" were the senders of executable programs creating mischief and mayhem as early as 1987 with the mainframe-based Christmas Tree EXEC.

Since the ILOVEYOU and Anna Kournikova worms of 2000 and 2001, email systems have increasingly added layers of protection to prevent potential malware. Now, many block certain types of attachments.
