= DiskDoubler =

Disk compression utility

- Developers: Salient Software, Symantec
- Operating system: Classic Mac OS
- Type: File Compressor
- License: Proprietary

DiskDoubler (DD) is a disk compression utility for classic Mac OS. Unlike a file compression utility that compresses files, directories and directory trees into a single archive file via user interaction, DiskDoubler compresses and decompresses files automatically, without user interaction. When an application reads a compressed file, DiskDoubler decompresses the data before providing it to the application. A later addition, AutoDoubler, adds background compression, compressing uncompressed files while the computer is otherwise idle.

DiskDoubler was created by Terry Morse and Lloyd Chambers, fellow employees at a small software firm that went out of business in 1989. Chambers had already released a version of the Unix Compress utility on the Mac as MacCompress. While working on another "real" project, Chambers wrote DiskDoubler in his spare time. When demonstrating their new product at a local Mac store, they noticed that it was DiskDoubler that got all of the attention. It was first shown publicly at the San Francisco MacWorld Expo in April 1990 (normally in January, but delayed that year) and by the end of the show had sold 500 copies. By the summer they were selling 1000 copies a month.

Realizing they needed real marketing muscle, they approached Symantec, who agreed to include it in their Symantec Utilities for Macintosh (SUM) package for a pittance. Unimpressed by the offer, they instead asked Guy Kawasaki to front them a $25,000 development loan, raised a similar amount on their own, and formed Salient Software. After four months sales were over $50,000 a month. When System 7 shipped in June 1991 sales took off, as the new system was rather hungry for drive space. The company was eventually sold to Fifth Generation Systems in 1992. They also repackaged it in a suite as SuperDoubler 4.0, including AutoDoubler, DiskDoubler, and a file-copy speedup known as CopyDoubler. For some time, DiskDoubler was the second-best selling product on the Mac, second only to After Dark, the popular screen saver. Fifth Generation was later sold, somewhat ironically, to Symantec, who re-released it as a fat binary as Norton DiskDoubler Pro 1.1. Symantec "sat" on the product and it slowly disappeared over the next year.

DiskDoubler concentrated on speed, originally supporting only a single variety of the LZ78 compression algorithm used in Compress/MacCompress to avoid having to try different settings. Nevertheless, the compression results were quite reasonable, notably on text files. Better yet, DiskDoubler was extremely fast, generally twice as fast as StuffIt, and 50% faster than Compact Pro, the two main archivers in use on the Mac in the 1990s. DiskDoubler also had the capability of decompressing StuffIt and PackIt files, which it did much faster than those programs could. Over the years DiskDoubler eventually ended up with four different algorithms, typically using the fastest compressor, DD1, for a first pass, and then running the most effective, DD3+, when the machine was idle. DiD3+ provided the highest compression of any Mac-based compression software, using knowledge of specific file types to improve over a "generic" LZW scheme.

Users typically interacted with DiskDoubler via an additional menu placed in the Macintosh Finder. Selecting a file, or group of them, the user selects Compress from the DD menu. The file in question is quickly compressed and replaced by a similar icon stamped with a small "DD" tag to indicate it was compressed. The original Classic Mac OS did not include any sort of composite icon support, so DiskDoubler had to copy and modify every icon it found and then hand those modified icons back to the Finder with a new file type. When a file was compressed, its (hidden) file type flag was changed to the one DiskDoubler "made up", making the Finder display the modified icon.

AutoDoubler (AD) was a small software daemon for which speed was the main concern, since AD was intended to be used "invisibly". For this reason it first used the AD1/DD1 "fastest" method to compress as many files as possible as quickly as it could, and then when that was complete it would go back and re-compress with DD3+ if the machine was still idle. DD/AD was so invisible that it would compress anything outside the System folder, including applications and various resources.

The main reason for better performance was that compressing a file and writing it was faster than writing the original file as the bottleneck was to be found in hard disk I/O times. The same is correct for reading and decompressing files.

The product also included a freeware (but closed source) decompressor known as DDExpand. Since DiskDoubler was intended to compress "in place" and generally be invisible, most users set up DiskDoubler to decompress automatically when copying files to other media so that it would open fine on other people's machines. Additionally, since the program decompressed files as they were opened, the simple action of archiving files using another utility like StuffIt automatically decompressed the files before they were inserted into the new archive. For these reasons the DiskDoubler format was rarely seen "in the wild", and DDExpand was rarely needed. DiskDoubler did include an option for this, however, which would combine several files into one archive. These could sometimes be found in software libraries, but was generally frowned upon.

DiskDoubler created a market for similar products. The first attempt to produce a similar product resulted in SuperDisk!, which, when released, was faster than DiskDoubler but offered less compression. SuperDisk! also offered "on the fly" compression, which DiskDoubler had not added at that point. An updated version of DiskDoubler fought back with a new compression scheme that ran entirely in the 256-byte cache of the 68020, which greatly improved performance. AutoDoubler was also included as a new feature. Now Software also introduced a product in this space called Now Compress. Aladdin Software eventually brought out their own solution as well, as StuffIt SpaceSaver. All of these products had a following during the era of small hard drives.

Eventually, a combination of shrinking Mac marketshare, changes to the underlying filesystem and ever-increasing drive space killed off this product niche.

With the introduction of Mac OS X Snow Leopard, Apple introduced a similar technology known as Transparent Compression into HFS Plus.

== See also ==
- Disk compression
