= Base32 =

Encoding for a sequence of byte values using 32 printable characters

Base32 is binary-to-text encoding based on the base-32 numeral system. It uses an alphabet of 32 digits, each of which represents a different combination of 5 bits (2^{5}). Since base32 is not very widely adopted, the question of notation i.e. which characters to use to represent the 32 digits is not as settled as in the case of more well-known numeral systems (such as hexadecimal) even though RFCs and unofficial and de facto standards exist. One way to represent Base32 numbers in human-readable form is using digits 0–9 followed by the twenty-two upper-case letters A–V. However, many other variations are used in different contexts. Historically, Baudot code could be considered a modified (stateful) base32 code. Base32 is often used to represent byte strings.

== RFC 4648 encodings ==
The October 2006 proposed Internet standard RFC 4648 documents base16, base32 and base64 encodings. It includes two schemes for base32, but recommends one over the other. It further recommends that regardless of precedent, only the alphabet it defines in its section 6 actually be called base32, and that the other similar alphabet in its section 7 instead be called base32hex. (Note: For context, the proposed standard also documents two base64 encodings, and here too expresses a preference for one, though for different reasons. Only one base16 encoding is documented – long universally adopted even prior to the publication of RFC 4648 or its predecessor RFC 3548.) Agreement with those recommendations is not universal. Care needs to be taken when using systems that are called base32, as those systems could be base32 per RFC 4648 §6, or per §7 (possibly disregarding that RFC's deprecation of the simpler name for the latter), or they could be yet another encoding variant, see further below.

=== Base 32 Encoding per §6 ===
The most widely used base32 alphabet is defined in RFC 4648 §6 and the earlier RFC 3548 (2003). The scheme was originally designed in 2000 by John Myers for SASL/GSSAPI. It uses an alphabet of A–Z, followed by 2–7. The digits 0 and 1 are skipped due to their similarity with the letters O and I (thus "2" has a decimal value of 26).

In some circumstances padding is not required or used (the padding can be inferred from the length of the string modulo 8). RFC 4648 states that padding must be used unless the specification of the standard (referring to the RFC) explicitly states otherwise. Excluding padding is useful when using Base32 encoded data in URL tokens or file names where the padding character could pose a problem.

The RFC 4648 Base32 alphabet
Value	Symbol	Value	Symbol	Value	Symbol	Value	Symbol
0	A	8	I	16	Q	24	Y
1	B	9	J	17	R	25	Z
2	C	10	K	18	S	26	2
3	D	11	L	19	T	27	3
4	E	12	M	20	U	28	4
5	F	13	N	21	V	29	5
6	G	14	O	22	W	30	6
7	H	15	P	23	X	31	7
						padding	=

This is an example of a Base32 representation using the previously described 32-character set (IPFS CIDv1 in Base32 upper-case encoding): BAFYBEICZSSCDSBS7FFQZ55ASQDF3SMV6KLCW3GOFSZVWLYARCI47BGF354

=== Base 32 Encoding with Extended Hex Alphabet per §7 ===
"Extended hex" base 32 or base32hex, another scheme for base 32 per RFC 4648 §7, extends hexadecimal in a more natural way: Its lower half is identical with hexadecimal, and beyond that, base32hex simply continues the alphabet through to the letter V.

This scheme was first proposed by Christian Lanctot, a programmer working at Sage software, in a letter to Dr. Dobb's magazine in March 1999 as part of a suggested solution for the Y2K bug. Lanctot referred to it as "Double Hex". The same alphabet was described in 2000 in RFC 2938 under the name "Base-32". RFC 4648, while acknowledging existing use of this version in NSEC3, refers to it as base32hex and discourages referring to it as only "base32".

Since this notation uses digits 0–9 followed by consecutive letters of the alphabet, it matches the digits used by the JavaScript parseInt() function and the Python int() constructor when a base larger than 10 (such as 16 or 32) is specified. It also retains hexadecimal's property of preserving bitwise sort order of the represented data, unlike RFC 4648's §6 base32, or base64.

Unlike many other base 32 notation systems, base32hex digits beyond 9 are contiguous. However, its set of digits includes characters that may visually conflict. With many fonts it is possible to visually distinguish between similar looking characters like (0, O) and (1, I), but in other fonts this may be difficult and thus they may be unsuitable for rendering base32 character sequences. This is especially true in a notation system that is only expressing numbers, when the context English usually provides is not present. (Note: The similarity used to be a feature, not a bug, because it allowed early typewriters to omit extra keys for the numbers 0 and 1, thus reducing mechanical complexity. When computers were introduced, it was felt desirable for early computer printers to be able to produce the same type as quality typewriters, hence typewriter-like fonts kept these letters looking alike. As of this writing in 2025, it is no longer necessary to use fonts that don't clearly distinguish some letters, but the tradition persists. It is also not just typewriter-style fonts that have similar problems – many influential fonts do, e.g. Helvetica.) The choice of font is controlled by neither notation nor encoding, yet base32hex makes no attempt to compensate for the shortcomings of affected fonts. (Note: The design of many base32 variants is driven by the view that it is risky to assume a distinguishable font will be used. On the other hand, the logic of a scheme not trying to compensate for quirks outside its remit may be more straightforward.)

The "Extended Hex" Base 32 Alphabet
Value	Symbol	Value	Symbol	Value	Symbol	Value	Symbol
0	0	8	8	16	G	24	O
1	1	9	9	17	H	25	P
2	2	10	A	18	I	26	Q
3	3	11	B	19	J	27	R
4	4	12	C	20	K	28	S
5	5	13	D	21	L	29	T
6	6	14	E	22	M	30	U
7	7	15	F	23	N	31	V
						padding	=

== Alternative encoding schemes ==
Changing the Base32 alphabet, all alternative standards have similar combinations of alphanumeric symbols.

=== z-base-32 ===
z-base-32 is a Base32 encoding designed by Zooko Wilcox-O'Hearn to be easier for human use and more compact. It includes 1, 8 and 9 but excludes l, v, 0 and 2. It also permutes the alphabet so that the easier characters are the ones that occur more frequently. It compactly encodes bitstrings whose length in bits is not a multiple of 8 and omits trailing padding characters. z-base-32 was used in the Mnet open source project, and is currently used in Phil Zimmermann's ZRTP protocol, and in the Tahoe-LAFS open source project.

z-base-32 alphabet
Value	Symbol	Value	Symbol	Value	Symbol	Value	Symbol
0	y	8	e	16	o	24	a
1	b	9	j	17	t	25	3
2	n	10	k	18	1	26	4
3	d	11	m	19	u	27	5
4	r	12	c	20	w	28	h
5	f	13	p	21	i	29	7
6	g	14	q	22	s	30	6
7	8	15	x	23	z	31	9

=== Crockford's Base32 ===
Another alternative design for Base32 is created by Douglas Crockford, who proposes using additional characters for a mod-37 checksum. It excludes the letters I, L, and O to avoid confusion with digits. It also excludes the letter U to reduce the likelihood of accidental obscenity.

Libraries to encode binary data in Crockford's Base32 are available in a variety of languages.

Crockford's Base32 alphabet
Value	Encode Digit	Decode Digit	Value	Encode Digit	Decode Digit
0	0	0 o O	16	G	g G
1	1	1 i I l L	17	H	h H
2	2	2	18	J	j J
3	3	3	19	K	k K
4	4	4	20	M	m M
5	5	5	21	N	n N
6	6	6	22	P	p P
7	7	7	23	Q	q Q
8	8	8	24	R	r R
9	9	9	25	S	s S
10	A	a A	26	T	t T
11	B	b B	27	V	v V
12	C	c C	28	W	w W
13	D	d D	29	X	x X
14	E	e E	30	Y	y Y
15	F	f F	31	Z	z Z

=== Electrologica ===
An earlier form of base 32 notation was used by programmers working on the Electrologica X1 to represent machine addresses. The "digits" were represented as decimal numbers from 0 to 31. For example, 12-16 would represent the machine address 400 (= 12 × 32 + 16).

=== Geohash ===
In the Geohash algorithm, a modified base32 representation is used to represent latitude and longitude values in one (bit-interlaced) positive integer. This representation uses all decimal digits (0–9) and almost all of the lower case alphabet, except letters "a", "i", "l", "o", as shown by the following character map:

Decimal	0	1	2	3	4	5	6	7	8	9	10	11	12	13	14	15
Base 32	0	1	2	3	4	5	6	7	8	9	b	c	d	e	f	g
Decimal	16	17	18	19	20	21	22	23	24	25	26	27	28	29	30	31
Base 32	h	j	k	m	n	p	q	r	s	t	u	v	w	x	y	z

=== Turing's encoding ===
In approximately 1950, Alan Turing wrote software requirements for the Manchester Mark I computing system. A transcription of Turing's manual for the Mark I is available on archive.org.

The University of Manchester's archive site commemorating 60 years of computing has a table of the base 32 encoding that Turing used. The table and the accompanying explanation also appear in the manual.

Another account of this period in Turing's life appears on his biography page under Early computers and the Turing test.

=== Video games ===
Before NVRAM became universal, several video games for Nintendo platforms used base 31 numbers for passwords. These systems omit vowels (except Y) to prevent the game from accidentally giving a profane password. Thus, the characters are generally some minor variation of the following set: 0–9, B, C, D, F, G, H, J, K, L, M, N, P, Q, R, S, T, V, W, X, Y, Z, and some punctuation marks. Games known to use such a system include Mario Is Missing!, Mario's Time Machine, Tetris Blast, and The Lord of the Rings (Super NES).

=== Word-safe alphabet ===
The word-safe Base32 alphabet is an extension of the Open Location Code Base20 alphabet. That alphabet uses 8 numeric digits and 12 case-sensitive letter digits chosen to avoid accidentally forming words. Treating the alphabet as case-sensitive produces a 32 (8+12+12) digit set.

Decimal	0	1	2	3	4	5	6	7	8	9	10	11	12	13	14	15
Base 32	2	3	4	5	6	7	8	9	C	F	G	H	J	M	P	Q
Decimal	16	17	18	19	20	21	22	23	24	25	26	27	28	29	30	31
Base 32	R	V	W	X	c	f	g	h	j	m	p	q	r	v	w	x

== Comparisons with other systems ==
=== Advantages ===
Base32 has a number of advantages over Base64:

1. The resulting character set is all one case, which can often be beneficial when using a case-insensitive filesystem, DNS names, spoken language, or human memory.
2. The result can be used as a file name because it cannot possibly contain the '/' symbol, which is the Unix path separator.
3. The alphabet can be selected to avoid similar-looking pairs of different symbols, so the strings can be accurately transcribed by hand. (For example, the RFC 4648 §6 symbol set omits the digits for one, eight and zero, since they could be confused with the letters 'I', 'B', and 'O'.)
4. A result excluding padding can be included in a URL without encoding any characters.

Base32 has advantages over hexadecimal/Base16:

1. Base32 representation takes 20% less space. (1000 bits takes 200 characters, compared with 250 for Base16.)

Compared with 8-bit-based encodings, 5-bit systems might also have advantages when used for character transmission:

1. Featuring the complete alphabet, the RFC 4648 §6 Base32 scheme and similar allow encoding two more characters per 32-bit integer (for a total of 6 instead of 4, with 2 bits to spare), saving bandwidth in constrained domains such as radiomeshes.

=== Disadvantages ===
Base32 representation takes roughly 20% more space than Base64. Also, because it encodes five 8-bit bytes (40 bits) to eight 5-bit base32 characters rather than three 8-bit bytes (24 bits) to four 6-bit base64 characters, padding to an 8-character boundary is a greater burden on short messages (which may be a reason to elide padding, which is an option in RFC 4648).

Length of notations as percentage of binary data
	Base64	Base32	Hexadecimal
8-bit	133%	160%	200%
7-bit	117%	140%	175%

Even if Base32 takes roughly 20% less space than hexadecimal, Base32 is much less used. Hexadecimal can easily be mapped to bytes because two hexadecimal digits is a byte. Base32 does not map to individual bytes; however, two Base32 digits correspond to ten bits, which can encode (32 × 32 =) 1,024 values, with obvious applications for orders of magnitude of multiple-byte units in terms of powers of 1,024 (kibi prefix, with symbol Ki).

Hexadecimal is easier to learn and remember, since that only entails memorising the numerical values of six additional symbols (A–F), and even if those are not instantly recalled, it is easier to count through just over a handful of values.

== Software implementations ==
Base32 programs are suitable for encoding arbitrary byte data using a restricted set of symbols that can both be conveniently used by humans and processed by computers.

Base32 implementations use a symbol set made up of at least 32 different characters (sometimes a 33rd for padding), as well as an algorithm for encoding arbitrary sequences of 8-bit bytes into a Base32 alphabet. Because more than one 5-bit Base32 character is needed to represent each 8-bit input byte, if the input is not a multiple of 5 bytes (40 bits), then it doesn't fit exactly in 5-bit Base32 characters. In that case, some specifications require padding characters to be added while some require extra zero bits to make a multiple of 5 bits. The closely related Base64 system, in contrast, uses a set of 64 symbols (or 65 symbols when padding is used).

Base32 implementations in C/C++, Perl, Java, JavaScript, Python, Go and Ruby are available.

== See also ==
- .onion – Special-use top-level internet domain
- Ascii85 – Encoding for a sequence of byte values using 85 printable characters
- Base16 – Encoding for a sequence of byte values using hexadecimal representation
- Base64 – Encoding for a sequence of byte values using 64 printable characters
- Base36 – Encoding for a sequence of byte values using 36 printable characters
- Base58 – Representation of binary data as text
- Geohash – Public domain geocoding invented in 2008
- Ngiti language — utilizes a base-32 numeral system
