= GNU Sharutils =

GNU Sharutils is a set of utilities to handle shell archives. The GNU shar utility produces a single file out of many files and prepares them for transmission by electronic mail services, for example by converting binary files into plain ASCII text.

A shell archive is a collection of files that can be unpacked by the Bourne shell. A wide range of features provide extensive flexibility in manufacturing shar archives and in specifying shar smartness. For example, shar may compress files, uuencode binary files, split long files and construct multi-part mailings, ensure correct unsharing order, and provide md5sum or byte count verification.

GNU unshar scans a set of mail messages looking for the start of shell archives. It will automatically strip off the mail headers and other introductory text. The archive bodies are then unpacked by a copy of the shell. unshar may also process files containing concatenated shell archives.

== See also ==
- shar
- tar file format
- ar (Unix)
- archive formats
