= UUTool =

Freeware application

UUTool was a freeware application written for the Apple Macintosh by Bernie Wieser. The purpose of UUTool was to uuencode and uudecode files, however, the application functionality grew to translate uLaw encoded files to AIFF format, segment large uuencoded files, and recombine multiple uuencoded files for decode.

== Technical details ==
UUTool uuencoded files and attached the .uu extension. However, UUTool was the first Macintosh program that encoded the data fork, resource fork, and finder information into one uuencoded file with the .mu extension. The format for this was to catenate the three pieces of file information and uniquely name the resource fork and finder info as files. This allowed for some interoperability on non-Macintosh platforms.

Example

begin 0700 myfile
...
end
begin 0700 .rsrc
...
end
begin 0700 .finfo
...
end

== Version history ==
1990	v1.0	first 68k version
1994	v2.3.2	most pervasive version and last of the 68k line
1995	v2.4	first (and last) FAT version for PPC

== See also ==
- uuencoding
- Pictures FAQ
- BinHex
- StuffIt
