= Zipit =

Zipit may refer to:

- ZipIt, a Classic Mac OS PKZIP program
- The Zipit wireless messenger (Z2) multi-protocol instant messenger system
