= ZipIt =

Mac OS data compression program

- The software icon for ZipIt 1.3.5.
- Developer: Tommy Brown
- Release: 25 January 1993; 33 years ago
- Final release: 2.2.2 / 2002; 24 years ago
- Operating system: Classic Mac OS; Mac OS X
- Type: File Compressor
- License: Shareware

ZipIt is a shareware data compression utility for archiving and compressing files on the Classic Mac OS and Mac OS X platforms. It was designed to be highly compatible with PKZIP on MS-DOS machines, reading and writing those files as well as performing any necessary line ending conversion or MacBinary encoding to ensure the files were usable on both platforms. It had an advanced user interface and offered a number of automation features, including AppleScript support. First released in 1993, the latest version of ZipIt is version 2.2.2, released in late 2002.

== History ==
A unique feature of the original Mac file system was its use of forks, essentially two separate files that the Finder maintained the illusion of being a single file. Files that were copied to other storage media automatically copied both forks. Operating systems that did not support this feature risked the problem of transmitting only one of the two forks, producing an unusable file. This led to a number of archive formats that combined the two forks along with any extended metadata into a single file suitable for hosting on other platforms.

The original PKZIP archive format did include a number of features intended to help support other file systems like the Mac, including things like longer filenames and some basic metadata. However, it did not support forks, and therefore was not directly capable of supporting Mac files in ZIP archives. This did not present a major problem in many use-cases, as the Mac had archive utilities that did support these features, like StuffIt and Compact Pro.

By the early 1990s, the ZIP format was becoming almost universal and a number of systems required it for data exchange. Notable among these were FidoNet mailers and offline mail readers like the QWK format. For those times when Mac users had to exchange simple files, like a text file, with a PC user, utilities like UnZip and MacZip worked with single files. These did not include a Mac-like interface and were suitable for only the most basic tasks.

ZipIt was introduced to address this problem by explicitly modeling the program's user interface after Compact Pro, which was lauded as one of the easiest to use archivers available. ZipIt essentially replaced Compact Pro's own internal compression system with PKZIPs, producing a program that looked similar but read and wrote ZIP files instead of CPT. ZipIt also included a number of automation features, notably support for AppleScript, which allowed it to be used with programs like Freddie, a QWK reader. A setting in ZTerm allowed downloaded ZIP files to automatically be associated with ZipIt, making download-and-open a simple task.

The initial stable version, 1.1.1, was released in March 1993. It allowed multiple archives to be opened or created, each one in a separate window. That version did not support hierarchical directories, instead, it encoded all of the files into a single-level archive. This had the downside that it would only allow one file with any given name in an archive. This was addressed in the 1.2.x versions, of which version 1.2.6 of 1994 was the final classic-MacOS release. In 2001, version 2.0 was released. This version supported both Mac OS X and Mac OS 9.

In tests with 1.1.1, ZipIt consistently outperformed both Compact Pro and StuffIt in terms of compression, by about 10% on average. Its speed was about the same as StuffIt, making it about half the speed of the very fast Compact Pro.
