= SMSI =

SMSI may refer to:

- Strong metal-support interaction, a phenomenon in catalysis
- The NASDAQ symbol for Smith Micro Software
