= Transparency (telecommunication) =

Property of a telecommunication system that allows data to pass through unchanged

In telecommunications, transparency can refer to:

1. The property of an entity that allows another entity to pass through it without altering either of the entities.
2. The property that allows a transmission system or channel to accept, at its input, unmodified user information, and deliver corresponding user information at its output, unchanged in form or information content. The user information may be changed internally within the transmission system, but it is restored to its original form prior to the output without the involvement of the user.
3. The quality of a data communications system or device that uses a bit-oriented link protocol that does not depend on the bit sequence structure used by the data source.

Some communication systems are not transparent. Non-transparent communication systems have one or both of the following problems:

- user data may be incorrectly interpreted as internal commands. For example, modems with a Time Independent Escape Sequence or 20th century Signaling System No. 5 and R2 signalling telephone systems, which occasionally incorrectly interpreted user data (from a "blue box") as commands.
- output "user data" may not always be the same as input user data. For example, many early email systems were not 8-bit clean; they seemed to transfer typical short text messages properly, but converted "unusual" characters (the control characters, the "high ASCII" characters) in an irreversible way into some other "usual" character. Many of these systems also changed user data in other irreversible ways – such as inserting linefeeds to make sure each line is less than some maximum length, and inserting a ">" at the beginning of every line that begins with "From ". Until 8BITMIME, a variety of binary-to-text encoding techniques have been overlaid on top of such systems to restore transparency – to make sure that any possible file can be transferred so that the final output "user data" is actually identical to the original user data.

== See also ==
- In-band signaling
- out-of-band communication
