= Quindar tones =

Tones used by NASA during human spaceflight communication

Quindar tones
The "intro tone", a 250-millisecond tone at 2,525 hertz, followed by a 250 ms 2,475 Hz "outro tone".

Quindar tones are the "beeps" that are heard during the American space missions. During the early days of the space program they were a means by which remote transmitters on Earth were turned on and off so that the capsule communicator (CapCom) could communicate with the crews of the spacecraft. It was a means of in-band signaling to simulate the action of the push-to-talk and release-to-listen (often referred to as PTT) button commonly found on two-way radio systems and walkie-talkies. However, even though the tones are no longer necessary with modern digital communication systems, they have been retained both for their historic aspect, and because flight controllers say they appreciate the audible cue of an imminent transmission.

== Rationale ==
When Mission Control (in Houston, Texas) wanted to talk to astronauts, the capsule communicator (CapCom) pushed a button (push-to-talk, or PTT) that turned on the transmitter, then spoke, then released the button. When the transmitter is local, this is easy to arrange: the transmitter is connected directly to the PTT button. But to stay in continuous contact with the astronauts as they orbit the Earth, or travel to the Moon, NASA had to use tracking stations all around the world, switching from one station to the next as needed. To get the voice signal to the remote transmitter, dedicated telephone lines connected these stations to Houston. NASA could either build a parallel system for operating the transmitters—one line to carry the audio and another to carry the control signal for the PTT button (out-of-band signalling)—or combine these two systems together, using audio tones to turn the transmitter on and off. Since dedicated phone lines were a very expensive measure at the time, NASA chose the use of tones to reduce the operating cost of the network. The same system was used in Project Gemini and was still in use with half duplex UHF Space Shuttle communications for transmitter radio frequency keying.

With modern digital communication systems, Quindar tones are no longer necessary because a single communication line can simultaneously carry multiple communication channels in the form of data comprising both speech and signaling (the PTT signal), as well as video and telemetry. However, Quindar tones can still be heard in missions like Crew-1 when the astronauts communicate with mission control.

== Implementation ==
The Quindar system, named after its manufacturer, Quindar Electronics, Inc., used two tones, both being pure sine waves that were 250ms long. The "intro tone" was generated at 2,525 Hz and signaled the "key down" key-press of the PTT button and unmuted the audio. The "outro tone" was slightly lower at 2,475 Hz and signalled the release of the PTT button and muted the audio. The two tones were generated by special equipment located at Mission Control, and they were decoded by detectors located at the various tracking stations.

The selection of the tones allowed them to travel in the same passband as a human voice, which has a range from roughly 300 Hz to 3,000 Hz.

== Common misconceptions ==
Two common misconceptions surround Quindar tones. The first is that one tone came from Earth and the other from the transmitters used by the astronauts while in space. This confusion exists because many ground-to-space transmissions were initiated by Mission Control and responded to by the astronauts. In this sequence, the CapCom would press the PTT, which would send the intro tone, and then speak. When finished speaking, the CapCom would release the PTT, which would send the outro tone, and the astronauts would respond to Mission Control. Therefore, those transmissions would consist of a "beep" (PTT press) followed by Houston talking, then another "beep" (PTT release) and finally the voice of the astronauts.

Another misconception about Quindar tones is that they were designed to signal the end of a transmission, similar to a courtesy tone used on many half-duplex radio repeaters. Although the astronauts may have secondarily used the Quindar outro tone to know when the CAPCOM had started/stopped speaking, no equivalent existed for Mission Control because the astronauts keyed their transmissions locally (inside the spacecraft) using either a PTT or VOX, neither of which required Quindar tones. Additionally, separate radio frequencies allowed both Houston and the astronauts to talk simultaneously if they wished and thereby made a courtesy tone unnecessary as a way to minimize the possibility of both of them speaking at the same time.

== Origin of the name ==
Quindar tones were named for the manufacturer Quindar Electronics, Inc., now QEI. Glen Swanson, historian at NASA's Johnson Space Center who edited the Mission Transcript Collection, and Steve Schindler, an engineer with voice systems engineering at NASA's Kennedy Space Center, confirmed the origin of the name. "Quindar tones, named after the manufacturer of the tone generation and detection equipment, are actually used to turn on and off, or 'key', the remote transmitters at the various tracking stations."
