= FTPmail =

FTPmail is the term used for the practice of using an FTPmail server to gain access to various files over the Internet. An FTPmail server is a proxy server which (asynchronously) connects to remote FTP servers in response to email requests, returning the downloaded files as an email attachment. This service might be useful to users who cannot themselves initiate an FTP session—for example, because they are constrained by restrictions on their Internet access.

== History ==
During the early years of the Internet, Internet access was limited to a few locations. High-speed links were not available for most users, and online connectivity was rare and expensive. Downloading large files (then considered to be over a few megabytes) was nearly impossible due to bandwidth limitations, as well as frequent errors and lost connections. The original FTP specification did not allow for a session to be resumed, and the transmission had to restart from the beginning.

FTPmail gateways allowed people to retrieve such files. The file was broken into smaller pieces and encoded using a popular format such as uuencode. The receiver of the email messages would later reassemble the original file and decode it. As the file was broken into smaller pieces, the chances of losing the transmission were much smaller. In case of loss of connectivity, the transmission could be restarted from that part. The process was slower but much more reliable. It also allowed people who accessed the Internet only through email using dial-up lines to download files that were located remotely. Unlike FTP, files could be transferred through FTPmail even if the user did not have an online Internet connection (for example, using BBSes or other specialized e-mail software).

Servers located at universities, such as ftpmail@sunsite.unc.edu and bitftp@pucc.princeton.edu, were popular. Some of these servers hosted software archives containing early versions of Linux and other GNU software. Access to these repositories via FTPmail was instrumental in allowing people from foreign countries to access these tools at a time when online connectivity was impossible from their location.

FTPmail services were common in the early 1990s but dwindled in importance as more users gained direct internet access through SLIP, PPP, and other Dial-up access internet protocols. FTP also has lost popularity in favor of other methods for file transfer, notably HTTP which is available to virtually all Internet users.

== Procedure ==
An email is sent to an FTPmail server with the command to be performed, inserted as the body of the message. The server then processes the request by logging on to the remote site, retrieving the file, encoding it, and returning the result via email.

== Basic commands used ==
| Command | Function |
|---|---|
| help | Returns a help file. |
| open [site[user[password]]] | Connect to site. |
| cd path | Change directory to path specified. |
| ls [path] | List the contents of the directory. |
| dir [path] | List the contents of the directory |
| get file | Get a file, the path to save can also be *mentioned. |
| size max[ K | M ] | Size when file is split before sending, the max size is Kb|Mb. |
| mode binary | Binary mode: archives, binary files. |
| mode ascii | ASCII mode: nothing but ASCII text. |
| quit | End of ftp-by-email message. |

== See also ==
- File Transfer Protocol
