= Guard tone =

Guard tone is a feature of wireline modems.

The guard tone is sent by the answering modem after it has sent the answer tone. It is a single continuous tone with a frequency of either 1800 Hz or 550 Hz, sent at a level of -6 dB or -3 dB, respectively, below the level of the transmitted data signal power.

It is used with V.22 and V.22bis modulation modes to prevent the high-band data signal from interfering with the operation of billing apparatus in certain countries where in-band signalling was commonplace in the 20th century.

1800 Hz is used in the UK and some Commonwealth countries, while 550 Hz is used in some Scandinavian countries. Guard tones are not used in North America.

The guard tone is controlled by the &G AT command of the Hayes command set.

North American Bell 103-style modems (300 bit/s) were incompatible with UK in-band signalling (the modem tones would disconnect the call) unless a guard tone is provided. Most of these (now-obsolete) modems did not support any command set and were unusable for international calls.

== See also ==
- In-band signaling
