= Compact Pro =

Software data compression utility

- Developers: Bill Goodman, Cyclos
- Final release: 1.52 / 1995; 31 years ago
- Operating system: Classic Mac OS
- Type: File Compressor
- License: Shareware
- Website: www.cyclos.com/compactpro.htm

Compact Pro is a software data compression utility for archiving and compressing files on the Apple Macintosh platform. It was a major competitor to StuffIt in the early 1990s, producing smaller archives in less time, able to create self-extracting archives without the use of an external program, as well as being distributed via shareware which greatly helped its popularity. A PC version was also available, ExtractorPC. Neither program is actively supported.

== History ==
When it was introduced in the early 1990s, Compact Pro (originally known as "Compactor") competed against StuffIt, which had been suffering from neglect after its original developer moved on to other projects. Compact Pro sported a clean interface and a variety of new features which quickly made it a favorite among the digerati. It quickly drove StuffIt from the leadership position and became very popular on BBS systems.

StuffIt 3.0 fought back with an even more powerful compression algorithm, a shareware version called StuffIt Lite with most of the same features, and the freeware StuffIt Expander which could decompress StuffIt archives and Compact Pro archives. Compact Pro never really regained its momentum after the release of StuffIt Expander. It maintained a niche among loyal users and as a preparation tool for Cyclos's "Smaller Installer" delivery package (which was notably used by Ambrosia Software), but disappeared from the market by the late 1990s.

Compact Pro also served as the inspiration for ZipIt, a PKZIP-compatible archiver that was expressly designed to look and work like Compact Pro.

== Features ==
Like most archiver systems, Compact Pro's primary purpose was to package up and compress files for transmission, then extract them again on the other side of the link. Unlike most systems, Compact Pro used a non-modal Mac-like UI that was widely lauded in the press.

Some of the more notable features included the ability to extract everything from an archive by double-clicking on it in the Finder with the ⌥ Option key held down, and automatically recognizing and converting BinHex formatted files back into native format without a separate step. Compact Pro also featured an easy-to-use system for splitting files into parts to fit on floppy disks, a feature that most archivers implemented in an external program, if at all. An odd, but oft-used, feature was the ability to include images and notes that would display when the archive was opened, using the same basic mechanism as TeachText.

Compact Pro also included the ability to produce self-extracting archives. Although this was becoming common in archivers at the time, its particular implementation was notable because the extractor "stub" code was quite small at about 13 kB (compared to StuffIt at 38 kB). In an era of 14400 bit/s modems, this was a worthwhile savings. Many considered even this to be too large to bother with, and there were a number of small third-party utilities to strip the stub off from an existing archive. Compact Pro's stub could also expand files that had been split into parts, a rare feature at the time.

At the time of its introduction, Compact Pro offered, by far, the fastest and best compression on the Mac. In use, "Compactor files were never more than 1% larger than StuffIt Deluxe's "Better"/"Best Guess" modes, but anywhere from 25% to 400% faster." Ironically, Compact Pro was even faster than StuffIt at extracting StuffIt files, often at least double the performance. It also allowed background operation under MultiFinder. Its speed remained superior to most other systems even after major upgrades had ended. Testing in the late 1990s show it remaining significantly faster and smaller than versions of StuffIt from years later.

Normal archives created with Compact Pro use the .cpt file extension, while self-extracting versions used .sea. File extensions are not normally needed on the Mac, but were commonly used on archives because they would typically be stored on some other system that would normally require them (PCs for instance).
