= Shar (file format) =

Unix file format

shar
- Original author: James Gosling
- Developers: Various open-source and commercial developers
- Operating system: Unix, Unix-like, VMS, Windows
- Type: Command

shar
- Filename extension: .shar
- Type of format: Archive format, shell script
- Open format?: Yes

In the Unix operating system, shar (from "shell archive") is an archive format created with the Unix shar utility. A shar file is a type of self-extracting archive, because it is a valid shell script, and executing it will recreate the files. To extract the files, only the standard Unix Bourne shell sh is usually required.

shar files are also sometimes called "sharchives" (from "/bin/sh archive").

Note that the shar command is not specified by the Single UNIX Specification, so it is not formally a component of Unix, but a legacy utility.

== Details ==
The shar format was developed before the advent of the MIME standard as a way to email one or more files, any of which could be text or binary. At the time, there was no portable way to reliably email a non-text file or a collection of files, e.g., a tar file format archive. Shar was also a common format for distributing software via Usenet, e.g., comp.sources.unix.

Today, MIME is the preferred method for emailing files as the shar format poses a risk due to being executable;. For legacy reasons, GNU provides its own version of shar in the GNU Sharutils collection.

== History and variants ==
James Gosling is credited with writing the first version of the shar utility in 1982, and also wrote an early example (allegedly 1978–79) of the concept in the form of this simple shell script:

# shar -- Shell archiver
AR=$1
shift
for i do
	echo a - $i
	echo "echo x - $i" >>$AR
	echo "cat >$i <<'!Funky!Stuff!'" >>$AR
	cat $i >>$AR
	echo "!Funky!Stuff!" >>$AR
done

The following variants of shar are known:

- shar 1.x (1982) by Gosling. Public domain shell script.
  - Current FreeBSD shar. 3-clause BSD license, shell script. Adds md5sum.
- shar2 or xshar (1988) by William Davidsen. Public domain, C program.
  - shar3 (1989) by Warren Tucker.
    - shar 3.49 (1990) by Richard H. Gumpertz. Adds uuencode support.
      - Current GNU sharutils. GPLv3, C program.
- cshar (1984) by Michael A. Thompson and Mark Smith, now lost to bitrot. C program.
- cshar (1988) by Rich Salz, C program. Likely influenced shar 3.49.
  - ccshar (1996), a modification to output a csh script instead. Rarely used on Usenet.

GNU shar is available as a separate package for Microsoft Windows as part of the UnxUtils collection of native Win32 ports of common GNU Unix-like utilities.

== Similar formats ==
A version of the same concept, but for the VMS operating system, was written in 1987 by Michael Bednarek from the Melbourne Institute of Applied Economic and Social Research as a DCL script, VMS_SHAR.COM. This was later maintained and extended by James A. Gray from Xerox, and Andy Harper from King's College London.

makeself (2001–) is a shell script that generates self-extracting tarballs (*.run, application/x-makeself) using the same shell script header technique. Using tar precludes makeself from being used in plain text directly, but the better compression and other functionalities has made it more popular in the 21st century among software vendors seeking to package Linux software.

== See also ==
- List of Unix commands
