= Human-readable medium and data =

Presentation of data for humans to read

ISBN represented as EAN-13 bar code showing both human-readable and machine-readable data

In computing, a human-readable medium or human-readable format is any encoding of data or information that can be naturally read by humans, resulting in human-readable data. It is often encoded as ASCII or Unicode text, rather than as binary data.

In most contexts, the alternative to a human-readable representation is a machine-readable format or medium of data primarily designed for reading by electronic, mechanical or optical devices, or computers. For example, Universal Product Code (UPC) barcodes are very difficult to read for humans, but very effective and reliable with the proper equipment, whereas the strings of numerals that commonly accompany the label are the human-readable form of the barcode information. Since any type of data encoding can be parsed by a suitably programmed computer, the decision to use binary encoding rather than text encoding is usually made to conserve storage space. Encoding data in a binary format typically requires fewer bytes of storage and increases efficiency of access (input and output) by eliminating format parsing or conversion.

With the advent of standardized, highly structured markup languages, such as Extensible Markup Language (XML), the decreasing costs of data storage, and faster and cheaper data communication networks, compromises between human-readability and machine-readability are now more common-place than they were in the past. This has led to humane markup languages and modern configuration file formats that are far easier for humans to read. In addition, these structured representations can be compressed very effectively for transmission or storage.

Human-readable protocols greatly reduce the cost of debugging.

Various organizations have standardized the definition of human-readable and machine-readable data and how they are applied in their respective fields of application, e.g., the Universal Postal Union.

Often the term human-readable is also used to describe shorter names or strings, that are easier to comprehend or to remember than long, complex syntax notations, such as some Uniform Resource Locator strings.

Occasionally, "human-readable" is used to describe ways of encoding an arbitrary integer into a long series of English words. Compared to decimal or other compact binary-to-text encoding systems, English words are easier for humans to read, remember, and type in.

== See also ==
- Self-documenting code – source code that is both machine-readable and human-readable
- Human-readable code
- Machine-Readable Documents
- Machine-readable data
- Data (computing)
- Data conversion
- Hellschreiber
- Human–computer interaction
- Human factors
- Plain text
- Quoted printable
