= Base62 =

Encoding for a sequence of byte values using 62 printable characters

Base62 is a binary-to-text encoding that represents arbitrary data (including binary data) as ASCII text. It encodes data as the 62 letters and digits of ASCII – capital letters A-Z, lower case letters a-z and digits 0–9.

123456789ABCDEFGHJKLMNPQRSTUVWXYZabcdefghijkmnopqrstuvwxyz
= 58 characters = base58

0123456789ABCDEFGHIJKLMNOPQRSTUVWXYZabcdefghijklmnopqrstuvwxyz
= 62 characters = base62

0123456789ABCDEFGHIJKLMNOPQRSTUVWXYZabcdefghijklmnopqrstuvwxyz+/
= 64 characters = base64

== Alphabet ==
The Base62 alphabet:

Value	Char	Value	Char	Value	Char	Value	Char
0	0	16	G	32	W	48	m
1	1	17	H	33	X	49	n
2	2	18	I	34	Y	50	o
3	3	19	J	35	Z	51	p
4	4	20	K	36	a	52	q
5	5	21	L	37	b	53	r
6	6	22	M	38	c	54	s
7	7	23	N	39	d	55	t
8	8	24	O	40	e	56	u
9	9	25	P	41	f	57	v
10	A	26	Q	42	g	58	w
11	B	27	R	43	h	59	x
12	C	28	S	44	i	60	y
13	D	29	T	45	j	61	z
14	E	30	U	46	k		
15	F	31	V	47	l		

== See also ==
- List of numeral systems
