= Allume Systems =

Developer of compression software, 1988–2004

Allume Systems, Inc.
- Formerly: Aladdin Systems, Inc. (1988–2004)
- Type: Subsidiary
- Industry: Software
- Predecessor: Aladdin Systems
- Incorporated: January 1989
- Founded: 1988
- Founder: David Schargel, Jonathan Kahn
- Fate: Acquired by Smith Micro Software
- Headquarters: Watsonville, California, U.S.
- Products: StuffIt, InstallerMaker, ShrinkWrap, Spring Cleaning, Aquazone
- Parent: Smith Micro Software (2005–)

Allume Systems, Inc. was a software developer based in Watsonville, California, best known for the StuffIt family of file compression utilities for Macintosh. The company was originally founded in 1988 as Aladdin Systems by David Schargel and Jonathan Kahn in New York City, and incorporated in January 1989.

== History ==
Aladdin Systems was established as a Macintosh-focused software company, building its reputation around data compression and disk management utilities. Its flagship product, StuffIt, became a widely-used standard for file compression on the Mac platform. The company also developed StuffIt InstallerMaker, a software delivery suite, the ShrinkWrap disk image utility (acquired from shareware developer Chad Magendanz in 1996), and Spring Cleaning, a system optimisation utility.

From 1995 the company began releasing StuffIt components for Windows, with the full StuffIt for Windows following in 2000. Ports for Linux and Solaris arrived in 2001, though both Unix versions were later discontinued after the Smith Micro acquisition.

In April 2004, Aladdin Systems was acquired by PC software publisher International Microcomputer Software Inc. (IMSI). Shortly afterwards, in July 2004, the company was required to change its name as part of a trademark settlement with Aladdin Knowledge Systems, adopting the name Allume Systems.

In 2005, Allume Systems was acquired by Smith Micro Software from IMSI. Under Smith Micro, the company expanded its catalogue to include graphics, imaging, internet security and utility software.

== Products ==
The core product line developed under the Aladdin Systems name included:

- StuffIt — file compression and archiving utilities, the company's flagship product
- StuffIt InstallerMaker — a software delivery and installation suite
- ShrinkWrap — a disk image utility acquired from shareware developer Chad Magendanz in 1996
- Spring Cleaning — a system optimisation and maintenance utility
- Aquazone — a marine aquarium simulation program
