= StuffIt =

Compression software

- Developers: Aladdin Systems, Smith Micro Software
- Stable release: 16.2
- Operating system: macOS, Windows
- Type: Data compression
- License: Proprietary
- Website: stuffit.com

StuffIt is a discontinued family of computer software utilities for archiving and compressing files. Originally produced for Macintosh, versions for Microsoft Windows, Linux (x86), and Sun Solaris were later created. The proprietary compression format used by the StuffIt utilities is also termed StuffIt.

In December 2019, Smith Micro Software, the product's most-recent owner and developer, officially announced that StuffIt had reached its end-of-life and that StuffIt products would no longer be developed. There was one final update in December 2020, adding support for the Apple M1 architecture and Intel Mac systems through a universal binary of the program.

== Overview ==
Stuffit
- Filename extension: .sit
- Internet media type: application/x-stuffit application/x-sit
- Type code: SIT!, SITD, SIT2, SIT5 (depending on file version)
- Uniform Type Identifier (UTI): com.stuffit.archive.sit
- UTI conformation: public.date public.archive com.allume.stuffit-archive
- Developed by: Raymond Lau (creator), currently Smith Micro
- Initial release: 1987; 39 years ago
- Container for: files, including resource forks

StuffIt was originally developed in the summer of 1987 by Raymond Lau, who was then a student at Stuyvesant High School in New York City. It combined the fork-combining capabilities of utilities such as MacBinary with newer compression algorithms similar to those used in ZIP. Compared to existing utilities on the Mac, notably PackIt, StuffIt offered "one step" operation and higher compression ratios. By the fall of 1987 StuffIt had largely replaced PackIt in the Mac world, with many software sites even going so far as to convert existing PackIt archives to save more space.

StuffIt soon became very popular and Aladdin Systems was formed to market it (the last shareware release by Lau was version 1.5.1). They split the product line in two, offering StuffIt Classic in shareware and StuffIt Deluxe as a commercial package. Deluxe added a variety of additional functions, including additional compression methods and integration into the Mac Finder to allow files to be compressed from a "Magic Menu", or seamlessly browse inside and edit compressed files without expanding them using "True Finder Integration".

StuffIt was upgraded several times, and Lau removed himself from direct development as major upgrades to the "internal machinery" were rare. Because new features and techniques appeared regularly on the Macintosh platform, the shareware utility Compact Pro emerged as a competitor to StuffIt in the early 1990s.

A major competitive upgrade followed, accompanied by the release of the freeware StuffIt Expander, to make the format more universally readable, as well as the shareware StuffIt Lite which made it easier to produce. Prior to this anyone attempting to use the format needed to buy StuffIt, making Compact Pro more attractive. This move was a success, and Compact Pro subsequently fell out of use.

Several other Mac compression utilities appeared and disappeared during the 1990s, but none became a real threat to StuffIt's dominance. The only ones to see any widespread use were special-purpose "disk expanders" like DiskDoubler and SuperDisk!, which served a different niche. Apparently as a side-effect, StuffIt once again saw few upgrades. The file format changed in a number of major revisions, leading to incompatible updates. PC-based formats long surpassed the original StuffIt format in terms of compression, notably newer systems like RAR and 7z. These had little impact on the Mac market, as most of these never appeared in an easy-to-use program on the Mac.

With the introduction of Mac OS X, newer Mac software lost their forks and no longer needed anything except the built-in Unix utilities such as gzip and tar. Numerous programs "wrapping" these utilities were distributed, and since these files could be opened on any machine, they were considerably more practical than StuffIt in an era when most data is cross-platform. With the release of OS X Public Beta, Aladdin Systems released StuffIt 6.0, which ran under OS X.

Stuffit X
- Filename extension: .sitx
- Internet media type: application/x-stuffitx application/x-sitx
- Type code: SITX
- Uniform Type Identifier (UTI): com.stuffit.archive.sitx
- UTI conformation: public.date public.archive com.allume.stuffit-archive
- Initial release: 2002; 24 years ago
- Type of format: archive file format
- Container for: files, including resource forks

Although it was late to market, Aladdin Systems introduced the completely new StuffIt X format in September 2002 with StuffIt Deluxe 7.0 for Macintosh. It was designed to be extendable, support more compression methods, support long file names, and support Unix and Windows file attributes. StuffIt X improves over the original StuffIt format and its descendants by adding multiple compression algorithms such as PPM, and BWT to LZW-type compression. It also added a "block mode" option, error correcting "redundancy" options to protect against data loss, and several encryption options. In January 2005, JPEG compression was added as a StuffIt X compression option (see the related 'SIF Format' below).

From the mid-1990s until the 2005 acquisition by Smith Micro Software, coinciding with the release of Mac OS X v10.4 "Tiger," StuffIt Expander came bundled with the Macintosh operating system.

Although Mac files generally did not use filename extensions, one of StuffIt's primary uses was to allow Mac files to be stored on non-Mac systems where extensions were required. So, StuffIt-compressed files save the resource forks of the Macintosh files inside them, and typically have the extension .sit. Newer (non-backwards compatible) Stuffit X-compressed files carry the file extension .sitx. Encrypted StuffIt archives created with the now-discontinued Private File utility will have .pf extensions. StuffIt-compressed ShrinkWrap disk images will carry .img or .image extensions. However, a Classic Mac OS version of StuffIt is needed to mount the images or convert them to a newer format readable in macOS.

Smith Micro Software offers free downloads of StuffIt Expander for Mac and Windows, which expands (uncompresses) files compressed using the StuffIt and StuffIt X format, as well as many other compressed, encoded, encrypted, and segmented formats. The shareware application DropStuff permits the compressing of files into the StuffIt X format.

The StuffIt and StuffIt X formats remain proprietary, unlike some other file compression formats, and Smith Micro Software charge license fees for its use in other programs. Given this, few alternative programs support the format.

There was also a "self-expanding" variant of StuffIt files with a .sea extension that runs as an executable. A utility called unsea exists to turn such an executable into a vanilla sit file.

== Derivative products ==
=== StuffIt Image Format (SIF) ===
Early in 2005, a new JPEG compression system was released that regularly obtained compression in the order of 25% (meaning a compressed file size 75% of the original file size) without any further loss of image quality and with the ability to rebuild the original file, not just the original image. (ZIP-like programs typically achieve JPEG compression rates in the order of 1 to 3%. Programs that optimize JPEGs without regard for the original file, only the original image, obtain compression rates from 3 to 10% (depending on the efficiency of the original JPEG). Programs that use the rarely implemented arithmetic coding option available to the JPEG standard typically achieve rates around 12%.)

The new technique was implemented as a StuffIt X format option in their StuffIt Deluxe product. They have also proposed a new image format known as SIF, which simply consists of a single JPEG file compressed using this new technique.

Pending filing of their patent, they retain knowledge of the details of this algorithm as a trade secret. Some details are disclosed in: the high JPEG recompression is achieved by undoing the last step of the JPEG compression itself (the Huffman encoding of quantized transform coefficients). Instead, the transform coefficients are compressed by a more efficient algorithm (a predictive model based on the DC coefficients of neighboring blocks). Similar techniques are also applied for other image file formats such as GIF and TIFF and even the MP3 music file format. By means of decomposition, the relatively high compression rates for individual file formats can also be achieved for container file formats such as PDF, PSD and even ZIP.

=== StuffIt Wireless ===
On July 5, 2005, Smith Micro Software announced their acquisition and intention to expand the new JPEG recompression technique to wireless platforms and other file formats. The initial press release and preliminary information saw the first use of the title “StuffIt Wireless.”

=== StuffIt Expander ===
StuffIt Expander is a proprietary, freeware, closed source, decompression software utility developed by Allume Systems (a subsidiary of Smith Micro Software formerly known as Aladdin Systems). It runs on the classic Mac OS, macOS, and Microsoft Windows. Prior to 2011, a Linux version had also been available for download.

== Notable features ==
=== Duplicate Folding ===
Duplicate Folding is a feature which saves even more space by only keeping one copy of a duplicate file in an archive.

== Issues ==
=== Backwards compatibility ===
Changes to the Stuffit compression format render previous versions of Stuffit or software using its API unable to decompress newer archives, necessitating installation of new versions. This incompatibility can be inconvenient for work flows where timely execution is of importance, or where the intended recipient's system is not capable of running newer versions of Stuffit. Though users are able to create archives in a legacy format, this functionality is not clearly exposed.

== Alternatives ==
macOS includes Archive Utility which decompresses the legacy open formats ZIP, GZIP, and BZIP2, and creates ZIP. In versions since 10.3 (Panther), it now preserves resource forks in the ZIP format, so Stuffit is no longer a requirement for Mac file compression. ZIP is also a de facto standard, making it more widely accepted for archives and sharing.

While StuffIt used to be a standard way of packaging Mac software for download, macOS native compressed disk images (DMG) have largely replaced this practice.

StuffIt might still be used in situations where its specific features are required (archive editing/browsing, better compression, JPEG compression, encryption, old packages). An open source alternative might be The Unarchiver, even if it doesn't support the last versions of the StuffIt file formats. Some 3rd-party software, such as the Macintosh Finder replacement Path Finder, use the licensed Stuffit SDK to gain all the features of Stuffit. The mar utility is advocated by some retrocomputing enthusiasts as a cross-platform alternative, but its archive format is different, and documentation other than the mar and mac-utils source code archives is scarce.

== See also ==
- List of archive formats
- List of file archivers
- Comparison of file archivers
- DiskDoubler
