= Xxencoding =

Binary-to-text encoding

xxencode is a binary-to-text encoding similar to uuencode which uses only the alphanumeric characters, and the plus and minus signs. It was invented as a means to transfer files in a format which would survive character set translation, particularly that between ASCII and the EBCDIC encoding used on IBM mainframes.

== The encoding process ==
xxencoded data starts with a line of the form:

 begin <mode> <file>

Where <mode> is the file's read/write/execute permissions as three octal digits, and <file> is the name to be used when recreating the binary data.

xxencode repeatedly takes in groups of three bytes, adding trailing zeroes if there are fewer than three bytes left. These 24 bits are split into four 6-bit numbers, each of which is then translated to the $n$th character in the following table:

           1         2         3         4         5         6
 0123456789012345678901234567890123456789012345678901234567890123
 |         |         |         |         |         |         |
 +-0123456789ABCDEFGHIJKLMNOPQRSTUVWXYZabcdefghijklmnopqrstuvwxyz

Each group of sixty output characters (corresponding to 45 input bytes) is output as a separate line preceded by an encoded character giving the number of encoded bytes on that line. For all lines except the last, this will be the character 'h' (the character mapping to the value 45). If the input is not evenly divisible by 45, the last line will contain the remaining N output characters, preceded by the number of remaining input bytes encoded as above. Finally, a line containing just a single space (or plus character) is output, followed by one line containing the string "end".

xxencoded data is generally distinguishable from Uuencoded data by the first character of the line ('h' for Xxencode, 'M' for Uuencode). This assumes at least one full-length line (45 encoded bytes/60 characters) in the output.

== Example ==
The following is an example of xxencoding a one-line text file. In this example, %0D is the byte representation for carriage return (CR), and %0A is the byte representation for line feed (LF).

file

 File Name = wikipedia-url.txt
 File Contents = http://www.wikipedia.org%0D%0A

xxencoding

 begin 644 wikipedia-url.txt
 OO5FoQ1cj9rRrRmtrOKhdQ4JYOK2iPr7b1Ec+
 end

== See also ==
- Binary-to-text encoding for a comparison of various encoding algorithms
