= Now Software =

Defunct Mac software company

- Industry: Software Engineering
- Founded: 1989; 37 years ago
- Defunct: March 2010
- Fate: Dissolved
- Products: Now Up-to-Date & Contact; Now Utilities; Now X

Now Software was the producer of Now Up-to-Date & Contact, a calendaring software and contact manager for individuals and groups, for macOS and Windows. The company was incorporated in 1989.

Now Software, then based in Portland, Oregon, was acquired by Qualcomm in 1997. At the time of acquisition, Qualcomm reported (based on data from the company and from industry research firm Softletter) that Now Software was the "71st-largest software company in the U.S. with close to two million users" of its products. Qualcomm also noted that Now Software's products had won high praise, "including Product of the Year, multiple Editor's and Reader's Choice honors and seven World Class Awards". In 1999, the intellectual properties of the original company, including the name, were acquired by Power On Software, which relaunched the company and name.

On August 27, 2009, the company released Now X, the successor to Now Up-to-Date & Contact. Now X was rated poorly by Macworld, which called it "a program that doesn't rise anywhere near the level of its predecessor".

In March 2010, the company suspended its day-to-day operations.

In 2011, InformationWeek included Now Up-to-Date & Contact in its list of "Great Lost Software", sixteen great defunct software applications, along with Adobe FreeHand, Adobe GoLive, Ecco Pro, HyperCard, Lotus Improv, Outlook Express, Palm Desktop, Ventura Publisher, WriteNow, and others.

Two of the original programmers of Now Up-to-Date, Dave Riggle and John Chaffee, moved on to found the software company BusyMac, which produces the software applications BusyCal and BusyContacts, filling a similar niche market to the one filled by Now Up-to-Date & Contact.

== Now Utilities ==
Now Utilities was a file utility product for Mac System 7. Now Utilities 2.0, in 1990, was named one of MacUser's "Top 100 Products for 1990".

As of Version 4 (released in 1993), Now Utilities includes Now Startup Manager, a facility for turning on and off system extensions, as well as rearranging the order in which they load (for compatibility reasons), NowSave, an automatic document saving facility (save after a configurable number of keystrokes or mouse-clicks); Super Boomerang (puts most recently used files into a menu); Now Profile (a system information collector); NowMenus (adds subfolders to the Apple menu); WYSIWYG Menus (Font, Size, Style menus render text as they would appear in a document); and Now Scrapbook (a replacement for the Scrapbook desk accessory). Earlier versions contained AlarmsClock, DeskPicture and ScreenLocker utilities, but these were removed in version 4. AlarmsClock, which drew its name from its ability to manage multiple alarms and notify users, was integrated into Now Up-to-Date, gaining the ability to notify users of the events on their calendar.

== See also ==
- Timeline of computing 1990–99 – other developments in computing during the heyday of Now Software
