= Base36 =

Encoding for a sequence of byte values using 36 printable characters

Base36 is a binary-to-text encoding that represents binary data in an ASCII string format by translating it into a radix-36 representation. The choice of 36 is convenient in that the digits can be represented using the numerals 0–9 and the letters a-z (the lowercase ISO basic Latin alphabet).

Each Base36 digit contains log_{2}(36) ≈ 5.17 bits of information, so six bits is sufficient to represent each digit. Base36 numbers can also be expanded to pairs of senary (base 6) digits.

== Conversion ==
Signed 32- and 64-bit integers will only hold at most 6 or 13 base-36 digits, respectively (that many base-36 digits can overflow the 32- and 64-bit integers). For example, the 64-bit signed integer maximum value of "9223372036854775807" is "1Y2P0IJ32E8E7" in base-36. Similarly, the 32-bit signed integer maximum value of "2147483647" is "ZIK0ZJ" in base-36.

=== Standard implementations ===
The C standard library since C89 supports base36 numbers via the strtol and strtoul functions

In the Common Lisp standard (ANSI INCITS 226-1994), functions like parse-integer support a radix of 2 to 36.

Java SE supports conversion from/to String to different bases from 2 up to 36. For example, and

Just like Java, JavaScript also supports conversion from/to String to different bases from 2 up to 36.

PHP, like Java, supports conversion from/to String to different bases from 2 up to 36 using the base_convert function, available since PHP 4.

Go supports conversion to string to different bases from 2 up to 36 using the built-in strconv.FormatInt(), and strconv.FormatUint() functions, and conversions from string encoded in different bases from 2 up to 36 using the built-in strconv.ParseInt(), and strconv.ParseUint() functions.

Python allows conversions of strings from base 2 to base 36.

Raku supports base2 to base36 for all its real numeric types with its builtins: base and parse-base.

== See also ==
- Senary – Base-6 numeral system
- Uuencoding
