= 8-bit clean =

Computer system that correctly handles 8-bit character encodings

In computer networking, a system is 8-bit clean if it processes 8-bit character encodings without altering the high bit or treating any byte as an in-band control code. This property can describe both a communications protocol and the software and devices that implement such protocols. Although many early email systems only supported 7-bit data, the vast majority of modern email systems are 8-bit clean.

== History ==
Until the early 1990s, many programs and data transmission channels were character-oriented and treated some characters like end-of-text (ETX) as control characters. Others assumed a stream of seven-bit characters, with values between 0 and 127; for example, the ASCII standard used only seven bits per character, avoiding an eight-bit representation in order to save on data transmission costs. On computers and data links using 8-bit bytes, this left the top bit of each byte free for use as a parity bit, flag bit, or metadata control bit. Seven-bit systems and data links are unable to directly handle more complex character codes which are commonplace in non-English-speaking countries with larger alphabets.

Binary files consisting of 8-bit octets cannot be transmitted through 7-bit data channels directly. To work around this, binary-to-text encodings have been devised which use only 7-bit ASCII characters. Some of these encodings are uuencoding, Ascii85, SREC, BinHex, kermit and MIME's Base64. EBCDIC-based systems cannot handle all characters used in UUencoded data. However, the base64 encoding does not have this problem.

== SMTP and NNTP ==
Historically, various media were used to transfer messages, some of which only supported 7-bit data, so an 8-bit message had high chances to be garbled during transmission in the 20th century. Some implementations ignored the formal discouraging of 8-bit data and allowed bytes with the high bit set to pass through. Such implementations are said to be 8-bit clean. In general, a communications protocol is said to be 8-bit clean if it correctly passes through the high bit of each byte in the communication process.

Many early communications protocol standards, such as RFC 780, 788, 821, 2821, 5321 (for SMTP), RFC 977 (for NNTP) and RFC 1056, were designed to work over such "7-bit" communication links. They specifically require the use of ASCII "transmitted as an 8-bit byte with the high-order bit cleared to zero", and some of these explicitly restrict all data to 7-bit characters.

For the first few decades of email networks (1971 to the early 1990s), most email messages were plain text in the 7-bit US-ASCII character set.

The RFC 788 definition of SMTP, like its predecessor RFC 780, limits Internet Mail to lines (1000 characters or less) of 7-bit US-ASCII characters.

Later, the format of email messages was redefined in order to support messages that are not entirely US-ASCII text (text messages in character sets other than US-ASCII, and non-text messages, such as audio and images). The header field Content-Transfer-Encoding=binary (Note: The header field Content-Transfer-Encoding=8BIT does not designate 8-bit clean, since CRLF has special significance.) requires an 8-bit clean transport.

RFC 3977 specifies that "NNTP operates over any reliable bi-directional 8-bit-wide data stream channel" and changes the character set for commands to UTF-8. However, RFC 5536 still limits the character set to ASCII, including RFC 2047 and RFC 2231 MIME encoding of non-ASCII data.

The Internet community generally adds features by extension, allowing communication in both directions between upgraded machines and not-yet-upgraded machines, rather than declaring formerly standards-compliant legacy software to be broken and requiring that all software worldwide be upgraded to the latest standard. The recommended way to take advantage of 8-bit clean links between machines is to use the ESMTP (RFC 1869) 8BITMIME extension for message bodies and the SMTP SMTPUTF8 extension for message headers. Despite this, some mail transfer agents, notably Exim and qmail, relay mail to servers that do not advertise 8BITMIME without performing the conversion to 7-bit MIME (typically quoted-printable, "Q-P conversion") required by RFC 6152. This "just-send-8" attitude does not, in fact, cause problems in practice because virtually all modern email servers are 8-bit clean.

== See also ==
- 32-bit clean
- MIME § Content-Transfer-Encoding
- Telnet
