= Smith Micro Software =

Software company founded in 1982

Smith Micro Software, Inc.
- Type: Public
- Traded as: Nasdaq: SMSI; Russell Microcap Index component
- Industry: Software
- Founded: 1982; 44 years ago
- Headquarters: Pittsburgh, Pennsylvania, United States
- Key people: William W. Smith Jr. (chairman and CEO)
- Revenue: ▲US $51.3 million (2020)
- Number of employees: 402 (2021)
- Website: smithmicro.com

Smith Micro Software, Inc., founded in 1982 by William W. Smith, Jr., is a developer and marketer of both enterprise and consumer-level software and services. Headquartered in Pittsburgh, Pennsylvania, Smith Micro maintains multiple domestic and international offices. United States locations include Aliso Viejo, California, and Pittsburgh, Pennsylvania. International offices are located throughout Europe and Asia. Currently, the company focuses on digital lifestyle solutions and security technologies, and is integrated into the evolving wireless media industry, as indicated by partnerships with cellular service providers such as Verizon Wireless, AT&T, and Sprint Corporation, now owned by T-Mobile US after the Sprint & T-Mobile merger in April 2020.

== Corporate history ==
Smith Micro's initial focus was on dial-up modem and fax software technology, distributing predominantly to OEM computer software/hardware manufacturers. Smith Micro established an IPO in 1995, and became publicly traded in the NASDAQ under the symbol SMSI. Initial stock values were approx. $12.75 per share.

As the company entered the 90's, dial-up internet was quickly being replaced by cable internet, DSL, and wireless broadband due to substantially higher speeds and increased reliability. This change led Smith Micro to venture into wireless and mobile network software. Network connection management became an expertise of the company and, Smith Micro quickly developed products of interest to large-scale mobile network operators such as AT&T, Bell Canada, Orange, Sprint, T-Mobile, Verizon, and Vodafone. While fax and modem-related products were still a part of their portfolio, the QuickLink Platform of wireless connection managers became a primary source of revenue in the early 2000s.

By 2005, Smith Micro acquired Allume Systems and their StuffIt data compression software. Soon after, Smith Micro acquired Israel-based image editing company, PhoTags. Smith Micro followed with two more acquisitions, (e frontier America and busineSMS.com Software.) By acquiring these smaller companies, Smith Micro rapidly expanded its consumer business presence, however the company retained focus on network and wireless-related products.

In early 2008, the company began to expand its portfolio with the addition of wireless access and mobile services. Smith Micro introduced multiple solutions for enhanced mobile communications, such as push-to-talk software, visual voicemail services, and video streaming. Smith Micro also expressed interest in WiMAX broadband, a newly developed cellular technology which was considered to be a 4G wireless protocol and the replacement of current 3G cellular systems.

In 2019, Smith Micro entered the retail technology space with its acquisition of ISM Connect, LLC’s Smart Retail product suite. Most recently, the company has continued to expand its family safety business through the acquisitions of Circle Media Labs’ operator business in February 2020, and the Family Safety Mobile Business of Avast Software s.r.o in April 2021.

== Products ==
=== Family safety ===
- SafePath
  - SafePath Home
  - SafePath IoT
  - SafePath Family
  - SafePath Drive

=== Communications ===
- CommSuite VVM (Visual Voicemail)
  - CommSuite VTT (Voice to Text)
  - CommSuite Cloud
  - CommSuite Caller

=== Smart Retail ===
- ViewSpot
  - ViewSpot Studio (Retail Display Management)
  - ViewSpot Dynamic Pricing Portal
  - ViewSpot Retail Analytics

== Major acquisitions ==
Acquisition date	Company	Business	Country	Value (USD)
July 2005	Allume Systems	Software / Data compression	United States	$11 million
April 2006	PhoTags	Software / Image editing	Israel	$6 million
December 2007	e frontier America	Digital distribution / Graphic design	United States	--
February 2007	Ecutel	Software, Wireless	United States	$8 million
January 2008	PCTel Wireless	Software / Wireless	United States	$59.7 million
December 2008	MxPlay	Software / Multimedia	United States	--
September 2009	Core Mobility	Software / Wireless	United States	$20.2 million
July 2016	iMobile Magic	Software	Portugal	$2.2 million
January 2019	ISM Connect	Software / Multimedia	United States	$9 million
February 2020	Circle Media Labs	Software / Multimedia	United States	$13.5 million
March 2021	Avast’s Family Safety Mobile Business	Software	United States	$80 million
