= Spotnet =

- Stable release: 1.8.1
- Operating system: Windows
- License: Freeware
- Website: Spotnet

Spotnet is an application originally developed in the Netherlands, on top of Usenet, providing a decentralized alternative to usenet indexing websites, and the NZB format in general. Spotnet allows users to create and browse private 'newsservers', or decentralized repositories of files and information. Members share spots (file sharing) with one another, similar to the seeding process in torrent sharing. Spotnet experienced tremendous growth since the closure of FTD in 2011.

While the uses of Spotnet and Usenet are varied, one of the most common is the creation of home media servers. Several third-party applications allow automatic download and categorization of spots - typically movies, TV shows, or music files, to assist with the creation and maintenance of stored media.

== Clients ==
Spotnet articles are placed in a textgroup, which can be headered using any Usenet client, but in order to get the full experience you need a client that is compatible with the protocol, for example:

- Spotnet (.NET)
- Spotweb (PHP)
- Spotlite (C)
- μSpotted (.NET)
- SpotGrit (.NET)
- Django-Spotnet (Python, Django)

Besides searching, most of these clients also have functionality for commenting on these spots, as well as adding new ones to the index. Other clients just implement the protocol, without the community-features:

- URD (PHP)
- BinReader (C++)
- Usenet Explorer (C++)

== Technical details ==
Spotnet is a XML-based format, placed in the header of usenet articles. This RSA signed XML contains metadata about a post (a group articles) usually found in a .NFO file, like a description/genre/format, but also references to an accompanying image and zipped NZB file elsewhere on usenet.

The Message-ID of such an article can serve as a link to the full post (similar to Magnet URI), because it indirectly references all required articles. These links can be spread on media like Twitter, without the need for a central server hosting them. For a full specification of the protocol see the Spotnet Wiki.

Spotnet uses four usenet groups:

- header group: free.pt
- nzb group: alt.binaries.ftd
- comment group: free.usenet
- report group: free.willey

== See also ==
- NNTP
- Newsgroup
- Newsreader (Usenet)
- List of Usenet newsreaders
- Comparison of Usenet newsreaders
