= Tin (newsreader) =

tin
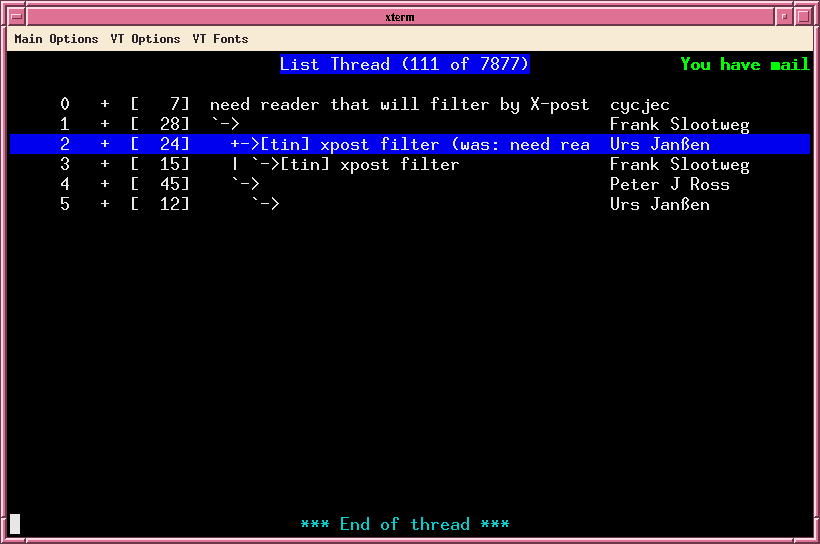
- Screenshot showing tin's threading of a topic
- Developer: Urs Janßen
- Initial release: August 23, 1991; 34 years ago
- Stable release: 2.6.5 / 24 December 2025
- Operating system: Unix, Linux, macOS, OpenVMS
- Type: Newsreader (Usenet)
- License: BSD-3-Clause
- Website: www.tin.org

tin is an open-source, text-based, threaded newsreader, used to read and post messages on Usenet, the worldwide distributed discussion system.

== History ==
Tin was initially used on text-only computer terminals connected via a slow serial interface to a multi-user time sharing central server, where graphics were generally not supported. At that point, the computer mouse did not yet exist. At the time, tin was considered to be somewhat of a high-resource program in this environment (similar to Pine) due to its use of terminal cursor control and page-oriented text scrolling to make navigating Usenet easier. While it did not have graphics support, it does provide a visually organized browser-oriented drill-down list of groups, subjects, and articles, instead of scrolling endless pages and menus from the bottom of the screen.

Tin is available for a variety of Unix-like operating systems. It is based on the TASS newsreader, whose source code had been posted in 1991 on Usenet by Rich Skrenta. The work on tin was begun shortly afterward by Iain Lea, who provided information for the IETF RFC 2980. Since 1996, tin has been maintained by Urs Janßen.

The program is generally compared with trn or nn. The latter is also based on TASS. Some note that tin has the most flexible threading support.

Tin runs on any UNIX or POSIX platform. This is because tin was an early adopter of autoconf in 1996. Older versions of tin also ran on OpenVMS; the newer versions which have UTF-8 support do not.

The original tin used termcap. Along with the portability improvements gained by using autoconf, its developers improved the adaptability by making it work with terminfo or curses—again improving portability. Changes such as localization using gettext, combined with IPv6 support, have kept the application current.

Unlike trn or nn, it is easy to follow the progress of changes since 1995 in tin because its changelog is detailed and dated.

== See also ==
- List of Usenet newsreaders
- Comparison of Usenet newsreaders
