= List of Usenet newsreaders =

Usenet is a worldwide, distributed discussion system that uses the Network News Transfer Protocol (NNTP). Programs called newsreaders are used to read and post messages (called articles or posts, and collectively termed news) to one or more newsgroups. Users must have access to a news server to use a newsreader. This is a list of such newsreaders.

== Types of clients ==
- Text newsreader – designed primarily for reading/posting text posts; unable to download binary attachments
- Traditional newsreader – a newsreader with text support that can also handle binary attachments, though sometimes less efficiently than more specialized clients
- Binary grabber/plucker – designed specifically for easy and efficient downloading of multi-part binary post attachments; limited or nonexistent reading/posting ability. These generally offer multi-server and multi-connection support. Most now support NZBs, and several either support or plan to support automatic Par2 processing. Some additionally support video and audio streaming.
- NZB downloader – binary grabber client without header support – cannot browse groups or read/post text messages; can only load 3rd-party NZBs to download binary post attachments. Some incorporate an interface for accessing selected NZB search websites.
- Binary posting client – designed specifically and exclusively for posting multi-part binary files
- Combination client – Jack-of-all-trades supporting text reading/posting, as well as multi-segment binary downloading and automatic Par2 processing
- Web-Based Client - Client designed for access through a web browser and does not require any additional software to access Usenet.

== Active ==
=== Commercial software ===
- BinTube
- Forté Agent
- NewsBin
- NewsLeecher
- Novell GroupWise
- Postbox
- Turnpike
- Usenet Explorer

=== Freeware ===
- GrabIt

=== Free/Open-source software ===
- Claws Mail is a GTK+-based email and news client for Linux, BSD, Solaris, and Windows.
- GNOME Evolution
- Gnus is an email and news client, and feed reader for GNU Emacs.
- Mozilla Thunderbird is a free and open-source cross-platform email client, news client, RSS and chat client developed by the Mozilla Foundation.
- Pan a full-featured text and binary NNTP and Usenet client for Linux, FreeBSD, NetBSD, OpenBSD, OpenSolaris, and Windows.
- SeaMonkey Mail & Newsgroups
- Sylpheed
- X Python Newsreader

=== Text-based ===
- Alpine
- Gnus (Emacs based)
- Line Mode Browser
- Lynx (has limited Usenet support)
- Mutt (3rd party patches)
- NeoMutt
- rn
- Slrn
- tin

=== Web-based ===
- Easynews
- Narkive
- Nemo
- Newsgrouper
- novaBBS

See Web-based Usenet for details.

== Discontinued ==
=== Commercial software ===
- Lotus Notes
- Netscape Communicator (superseded by Mozilla)
- Windows Mail – replaced Outlook Express for Windows Vista – terminated by Windows 7
- Windows Live Mail – replaced Outlook Express for Windows XP; optional for Windows XP, Windows Vista, and Windows 7

=== Freeware ===
- Opera Mail
- Xnews – MS Windows
- MT NewsWatcher – Mac OS X Universal Binary

=== Free/Open Source ===
- Arachne (with aranews.apm package)
- Arena
- Argo
- Beonex Communicator
- KNode (may be embedded in Kontact)
- Mozilla Mail & Newsgroups (renamed to SeaMonkey)
- Spotnet

=== Shareware ===
- Unison – Mac OS X

=== Text-based ===
- Agora (email server)
- Pine

=== Web-based ===
- Google Groups – discontinued on February 22, 2024

== Comparison ==
Name	User interface	Client type	Downloading headers XOVER	PAR	NZB	unZip or unRAR	Integrated search service (retention / $$$/yr)	IPv6	SSL/TLS	Audio video streaming	Price	Platform	License	Other
Arachne	GUI	Traditional newsreader	Yes	No	No						Free	DOS, Unix-like	GPL	
BinTube	GUI	Binary Grabber	No	Yes	Yes	Yes	Yes (3200 days / free)	Yes	Yes	Yes	$59.95 / Free with subscription	Windows	Proprietary	Streams media while downloading; free with Usenet service
Claws Mail	GUI	Traditional newsreader	Yes	No	No	No	No	Yes		No	Free	Cross-platform	GPL	
Forté Agent	GUI	Combination	Yes	Yes	Yes	Yes			Yes		$29	Windows	Proprietary	Shareware, includes 3 month newsgroup service trial
Gnus	Text-based	Traditional newsreader	Yes	No	No	No	No	Yes	Yes	No	Free	Cross-platform	GPL	Runs in Emacs; also does Email
GrabIt	GUI	Binary Grabber	Yes	Yes	Yes	Yes	Yes ( 30 days / $24.99/yr )	No	Yes		Free (searching extra)	Windows	Proprietary	Usenet search service
GroupWise	GUI	Traditional newsreader	Yes	No	No						Varies	Windows, Unix-like	Proprietary	
HCL Notes	GUI	Traditional newsreader	Yes	No	No						Varies	Windows, Unix-like, macOS	Proprietary	
KNode	GUI	Traditional newsreader	Yes	No	No			Yes	Yes		Free	Unix-like	GPL	KDE
Lynx	Text-based	Traditional newsreader	Yes	No	No			Yes	Yes		Free	Cross-platform	GPL	Limited USENET support
Mozilla Mail & Newsgroups	GUI	Traditional newsreader	Yes	No	No	No	No				Free	Cross-platform	MPL–GPL–LGPL tri-license	Replaced by SeaMonkey Mail & Newsgroups
Mozilla Thunderbird	GUI	Traditional newsreader	Yes	No	No	No	No	Yes	Yes		Free	Cross-platform	MPL	Plugin support
NewsLeecher	GUI	Combination	Yes	Yes	Yes	Yes	Yes Optional extra Add $10 per year	No	Yes		Varies	Windows	Proprietary	Shareware
Opera Mail	GUI	Traditional newsreader	Yes	No	No		No	Yes	Yes		Free	Cross-platform	Proprietary	Part of Opera, up to version 12.17
Outlook Express	GUI	Traditional newsreader	Yes	No	No	No	No	Yes	Yes			Windows	Proprietary	Part of Windows, up to Windows Server 2003
Pan	GUI	Combination	Yes	No	Yes	No		Yes	Yes		Free	Unix-like, Windows	GPL	Gtk+
SeaMonkey Mail & Newsgroups	GUI	Traditional newsreader	Yes	No	No	No	No	Yes	Yes		Free	Cross-platform	MPL	Replaced Mozilla Mail & Newsgroups
slrn	text-based	Traditional newsreader	Yes	Yes (using macros)	Yes (using macros)	Yes (using macros)	No	Yes	Yes	No	Free	Cross-platform	GPLv2+	Highly extensible using S-Lang scripts (macros)
Sylpheed	GUI	Traditional newsreader	Yes	No	No				Yes		Free	Cross-platform	GPL–LGPL	Gtk+
tin	text-based	Traditional newsreader	Yes	No	No	No		Yes	Yes		Free	Unix-like	BSD	Free software
Unison	GUI	Combination	Yes	Yes	Yes	Yes	No	Yes	Yes	Yes (audio only)	Free	macOS	Proprietary	Development ceased; free, unsupported
Usenet Explorer	GUI	Combination	Yes	Yes	Yes	Yes	Yes ( 1500 days / $23.34/yr )	Yes	Yes		$35	Windows	Proprietary	Shareware
Windows Live Mail	GUI	Traditional newsreader	Yes					Yes			Free	Windows	Proprietary	
Windows Mail	GUI	Traditional newsreader	Yes					Yes				Windows	Proprietary	Part of Windows Vista and Windows Server 2008; Windows 10 omits newsgroup and Usenet support
Xnews	GUI	Combination	Yes	No	No (Can create NBZs)			No			Free	Windows	Proprietary	

Name field background color legend:

active product
Discontinued support for newsgroups

== See also ==
- alt.* hierarchy
- List of newsgroups
- List of Usenet newsreaders
- News server
- Newsreader (Usenet)
- Network News Transfer Protocol
- Usenet newsgroup
