= Usenet Explorer =

- Developer: Alex Birj
- Initial release: 2005
- Stable release: 7.6.5 / 11 January 2026
- Operating system: Windows
- Type: News client
- License: Proprietary, Shareware
- Website: UsenetExplorer.com

Usenet Explorer is a Usenet client for the Microsoft Windows operating system. It is designed to handle binary and text Usenet posts and capable of handling large newsgroups effectively. The proprietary Usenet indexing search service with more than 14-year retention also has the capability to browse indexed newsgroups. The program has automatic unpacking feature: par2 repair / unrar / un7z / unzip / joining split files with the ability to perform several unpacking tasks in parallel. It can unrar multipart rar files while downloading them (incremental unrar). When using integrated search or nzb file as a download source the download is presented as a single combined entry (so-called custom collection) and all the way to the ready to view or listen media files then becomes seamless and completely automatic. This simple routine makes the program valuable to novice Usenet users.

Usenet Explorer supports all existing standards for compressing headers, SSL TLS 1.3 and includes native x64 version. The program can handle large downloads and cope with intentionally malformed posts by NZB websites.

Spotnet and Newznab communication protocols are also supported.

The program is shareware operating on an annual subscription to retain search function; posting and par2 repair (QuickPar replacement) features are free.

Usenet Explorer is listed as compatible with the Linux Wine software.

== See also ==
- List of Usenet newsreaders
- Comparison of Usenet newsreaders
