= Kill file =

File used in Usenet groups to hide people or subjects

A kill file (also killfile, bozo bin or twit list) is a file that stores text matching patterns that are used in some Usenet reading programs to filter out (ignore) articles by subject, author, or other header information. Adding a pattern to a kill file results in matching articles being ignored by the person using the newsreader. By extension, the term may describe a decision to ignore an author or topic. A kill file feature was first implemented in Larry Wall's rn.

== Variations ==
Some newsreaders allow the user to specify a time period to keep an author in the kill file.

An ignore list is a similar yet simpler feature found in some web-based forums, including some web-based Usenet portals, which filters out posts by author only.

Scoring is a more advanced feature found in some newsreaders, including Gnus. The newsreader uses fuzzy logic to apply arbitrarily complex overlapping rules, stored in score files, to score articles. An article is ignored when its score is below a user-defined threshold. For example, articles might score as ignored (killed) if it violates too many low-weighted stylistic rules (e.g. containing too many capital letters or too little punctuation, implying an annoying reading experience), or only one or two highly-weighted rules (such as the body containing objectionable keywords or the origin being a known source of spam).

== History ==
Jerry Pournelle wrote in 1986 of his wish for improvements to an offline reader for the Byte Information Exchange online service: "What I really need, though, is a program that will ... sort through the messages, assigning some to a priority file and others to the bit bucket depending on subject matter and origin".

== Media ==
In William Gibson's novel Idoru, the virtual community Hak Nam is built around an "inverted killfile" and is modeled on Kowloon Walled City.

== See also ==
- Circular File – Container to temporarily store waste
- Email filtering – Processing of email to organize it according to specified criteria
- Kill notice – Statement issued by an intelligence agency asserting the unreliability of a source
- Shadow banning – Blocking a user from an online community without their awareness
- Usenet death penalty – Policy of blocking and deleting posts
