= Pan (newsreader) =

Open-source newsreader

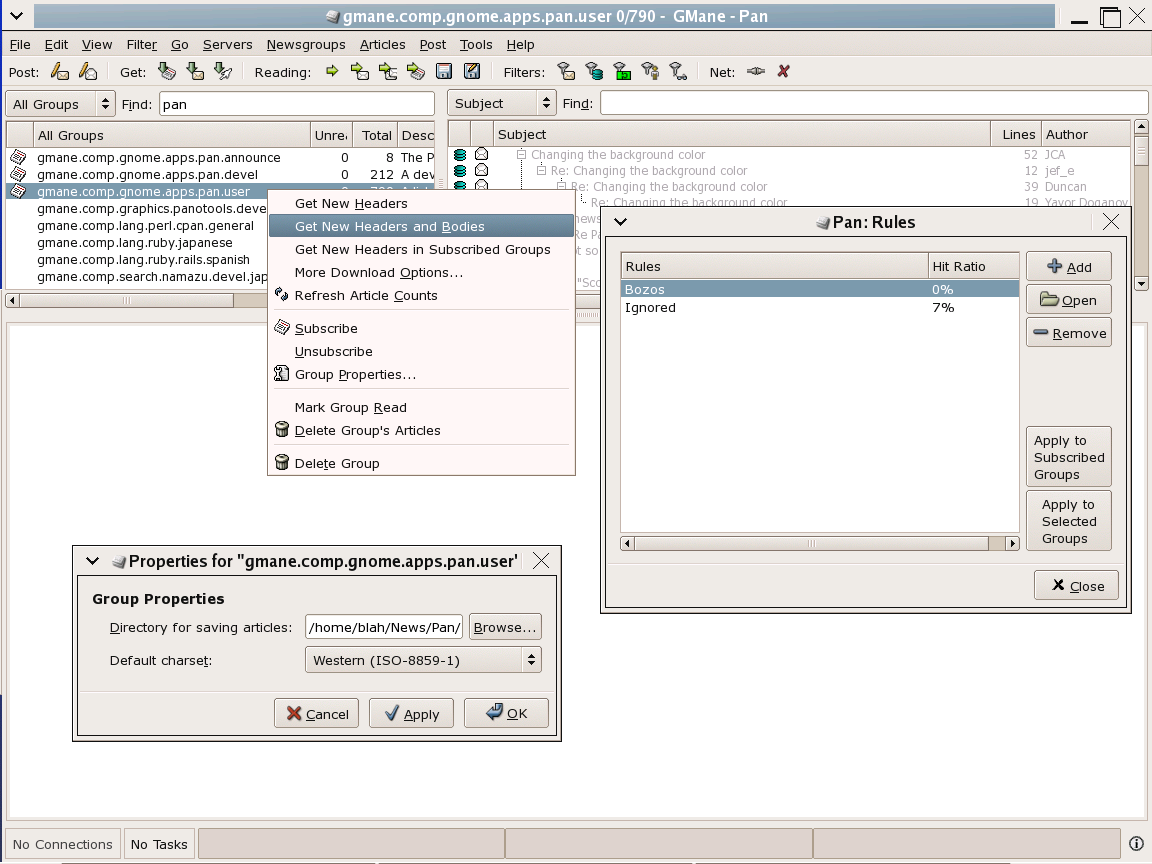
- Pan screenshot showing the Gmane newsserver and the pan user list
- Original author(s): Matt Eagleson
- Initial release: 30 July 1999; 25 years ago
- Stable release: 0.160 / 11 August 2024
- Repository: gitlab.gnome.org/GNOME/pan
- Operating system: Linux, FreeBSD, NetBSD, OpenBSD OpenSolaris, and Windows
- Type: News client
- License: GPL-2.0-only
- Website: pan.rebelbase.com

Pan is a news client for multiple operating systems, developed by Charles Kerr and others. It supports offline reading, multiple servers, multiple connections, fast (indexed) article header filtering and mass saving of multi-part attachments encoded in uuencode, yEnc and base64; images in common formats can be viewed inline. Pan is free software available for Linux, FreeBSD, NetBSD, OpenBSD, OpenSolaris, and Windows.

Pan is popular for its large feature set. It passes the Good Netkeeping Seal of Approval 2.0 set of standards for newsreaders.

== Name ==
The name Pan originally stood for Pimp-ass newsreader. As Pan became an increasingly popular and polished application, the full name was perceived to be unprofessional and in poor taste, so references to it have been removed from the program and its website.

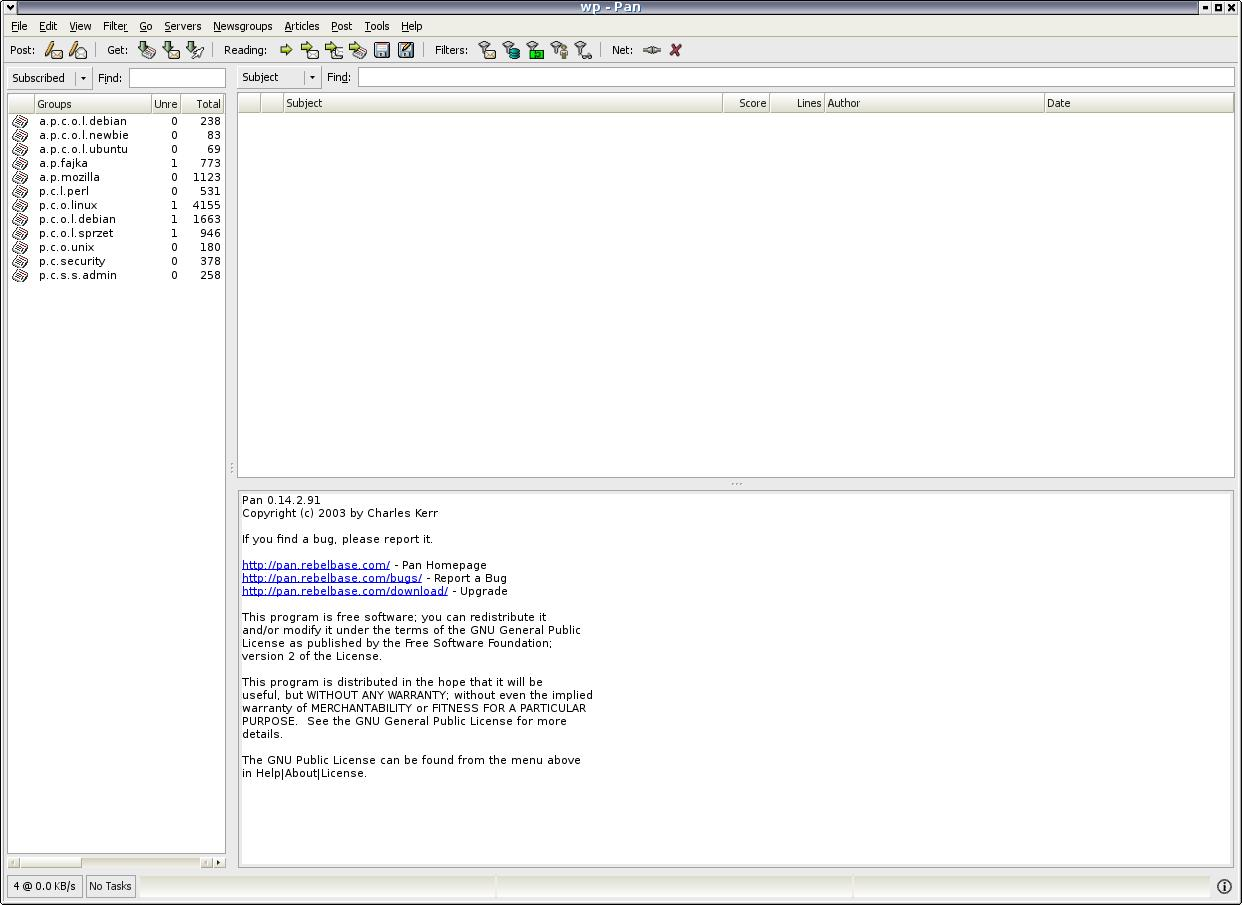
Pan 0.14.2.91

== See also ==
- List of Usenet newsreaders
- Comparison of Usenet newsreaders
