= NewsLeecher =

Usenet client

- Developer: Crystal Art Software
- Release: 1.0 Final / 24 September 2004
- Stable release: 7.0 / 6 June 2016
- Preview release: 8.0 Beta 4 / 15 December 2019
- Operating system: Windows
- Type: News client
- License: Proprietary, Shareware
- Website: www.newsleecher.com

NewsLeecher is a binary Usenet client, launched in 2002, compatible with the Microsoft Windows operating system

== Uses ==
NewsLeecher is generally considered a combination client, used primarily for the reading and downloading of content from usenet newsgroups. Despite being considered as having combined functionality, it is only capable of posting text; it does not support the posting of binary articles.

== Features ==
- Binary and text article downloads
- Text upload (posting) only
- PAR2 support
- Download scheduler
- Multiple connections
- SSL support
- NZB support
- Automatic split archive extraction and joining
- Some features are only available in the paid version, at extra cost

== Future Development - Abandoned? ==
The Nesleecher client hasn't had a final version released since 2016, and the current beta release has been stalled since 2019.

== See also ==
- List of Usenet newsreaders
- Comparison of Usenet newsreaders
