= GrabIt =

Freeware Usenet newsreader

- GrabIt 1.62 running on Windows XP
- Developer: Ilan Shemes
- Preview release: 1.7.5b3 / May 2020
- Operating system: Microsoft Windows
- Type: News client
- Licence: Closed source
- Website: www.shemes.com

GrabIt is a freeware Usenet newsreader for Windows developed by Ilan Shemes.

== History ==
Ilan Shemes has been making GrabIt changes since the program has been introduced. SSL support was introduced in version 1.7.2 Beta.

== Features ==
The GrabIt program is solely used to read and download binaries from usenet news server. GrabIt has Yenc and NZB support and can have up to 50 simultaneous connections.

GrabIt is one of the few newsreaders to include a search function. This search function searches all of the newsgroups on the Shemes news service. This is beneficial for the user wanting to find a certain binary or article. The downside to the search is that a user can only do a fixed number of searches without being subscribed to Shemes news service. Also the queries returned will be those listed in the Shemes service and not necessarily of the user's service. As of GrabIt Beta 1.7.2 Beta 3 SSL encryption is now supported.

== See also ==
- List of Usenet newsreaders
- Comparison of Usenet newsreaders
