= Newsreader =

Newsreader or Newsreaders can refer to:

- News presenter, a person that presents a news show
  - Category:Broadcasters
  - Category:Lists of journalists

== Computer programs ==
- Newsreader (Usenet), for reading articles from newsgroups
  - List of Usenet newsreaders
  - Category:Usenet clients
- News aggregator (AKA feed reader, amongst various terms), for collecting digital content from the internet supplied by web feeds

== Television series ==
- Newsreaders (2013–2015), an American comedy, on Cartoon Network's Adult Swim; a spin-off of Childrens Hospital
- The Newsreader (2021–2025), an Australian drama, on ABC Television

== Other uses ==
- Newsreader (Rome character), portrayed by Ian McNeice, in the 2005–2007 HBO television series Rome

== See also ==
- "The New Newsreader" (1993), episode 30 of series 3 of British sitcom Drop the Dead Donkey
