= News Watch =

News Watch (also expressed as Newswatch or NewsWatch) is a name or brand associated with the following:

- NewsWatch 15, a regional cable television channel in New Orleans, Louisiana, US
- NewsWatch (branding), a branding used for local newscasts in the United States and Canada
  - NewsWatch 12, the newscast branding for WJFW-TV in Rhinelander, Wisconsin, US
  - NewsWatch 12, the newscast branding for KDRV in Medford, Oregon, US
  - Newswatch 13, the newscast branding for KVTV in Laredo, Texas, US
  - NewsWatch 24, the newscast branding for WATN-TV in Memphis, Tennessee, US
  - Newswatch 16, the newscast branding for WNEP-TV in Scranton, Pennsylvania, US
- Newswatch (British TV programme), a weekly news program on the BBC in the United Kingdom
- Newswatch (Nigeria), a news magazine published in Nigeria
- NewsWatch (Philippine TV program), a news program aired on Radio Philippines Network in the Philippines
  - NewsWatch Junior Edition, installation of NewsWatch aired on Radio Philippines Network
- NewsWatch Plus, a Philippine digital news media service
- News Watch (news package), a television news music package by Frank Gari
- News Watch 9, the flagship network television newscast of NHK in Japan
- CBN NewsWatch, the evening newscast for the Christian Broadcasting Network

== See also ==
- NewsWatcher, a series of freeware and open source newsreader software
