= Xnews =

Newsreader software

XNews
- Developer: Luu Tran
- Stable release: 5.04.25 / 25 April 2002; 23 years ago
- Preview release: 2009.05.01 / 1 May 2009; 16 years ago
- Written in: Object Pascal using Embarcadero Delphi
- Operating system: Microsoft Windows
- Type: News client
- License: proprietary Freeware
- Website: xnews.newsguy.com

Xnews is a freeware Usenet newsreader created by Luu Tran. It is written in Delphi, and it is 100% GNKSA 2.0 compliant. Some of its features were inspired by the program NewsXpress.

Tran says that he designs the Xnews interface and features for himself only, reflecting his "preferences, habits, and sensibility."

Xnews does not support UTF-8 (or any other character set encoding), making it difficult or even impossible to use for reading or posting articles in languages other than English. It is, however, possible to run Xnews with "Mime-proxy" to at least partially work around this issue.

Xnews does not natively support SSL, but it can be added using "Stunnel".

Questions and discussion about Xnews can be found in the Usenet group news.software.readers

The author never officially announced the stopping of his work on the program, but its website went offline around late 2014 or early 2015, and by that time the latest official version was around five years old.

== See also ==
- List of Usenet newsreaders
- Comparison of Usenet newsreaders
