= BinTube =

Usenet client

- Developer: BinTube.com
- Release: 2007
- Stable release: 4.8.1.0 / 14 February 2021
- Operating system: Windows
- Type: News client
- License: Proprietary, Shareware
- Website: BinTube.com

BinTube is a binary Usenet client for the Microsoft Windows operating system.

== Features ==
BinTube streams video, audio and images directly from Usenet. Other features include SSL connections, automatic repair of downloaded data and OpenSearch search giving it the capability to find content on most web based Usenet search engines.

== See also ==
- List of Usenet newsreaders
- Comparison of Usenet newsreaders
