= YProxy =

yProxy (Pro)
- Developer(s): Brawnylads Software
- Stable release: 1.7 / November 1, 2009
- Operating system: Microsoft Windows
- Type: Network utility
- License: Proprietary
- Website: http://www.yproxy.com

yProxy is a Network News Transfer Protocol (NNTP) proxy server for the Windows operating system. yProxy's main function is to convert yEnc-encoded attachments to UUE-encoded attachments on the fly. The main purpose of this is to add functionality to NNTP newsreaders that do not have native support for yEnc. The inventor of yEnc recommends yProxy for use by Windows users whose newsreaders do not support yEnc decoding.

yProxy comes in two varieties:

1. yProxy
2. yProxy Pro

== yProxy ==
The latest free version of yProxy is version 1.3.

=== History of yProxy ===
yEnc (8 bit ASCII yEncoding of 8 bit data) was released in 2001, and almost immediately the most popular utility for decoding yEnc became a software utility named yEnc32. yEnc32 was an early provider of yEnc decoding, but yEnc32, while flexible through its user interface, requires manual steps to decode yEnc attachments.

In the spring of 2002, shortly after yEnc gained popularity in binary newsgroups, yProxy was released as freeware. yProxy was designed to convert yEnc attachments as they are downloaded, without user intervention. Because yProxy is a proxy server, once it is configured, the user must only ensure that yProxy is running in order to use it.

Due to the design of yProxy as a generic NNTP proxy server, yProxy can be used by any NNTP newsreader. There are many free and commercial NNTP newsreader clients that do not natively support yEnc. yProxy was designed to let the user continue to use his or her existing newsreader.

As of May 31, 2007, the following, popular, free newsreaders do not support yEnc:

- Outlook Express
- Windows Mail
- Windows Live Mail
- Mozilla Thunderbird

The free version of yProxy is not supported on Windows Vista or Windows 7 due to yProxy's dependency on WinHelp for the help file. In addition, the free version of yProxy only includes instructions for configuring Outlook Express, which does not apply to Windows Vista's free email and NNTP client, Windows Mail or Windows Live Mail for Windows 7.

The free version of yProxy is still available for download via links on the FAQ page of yProxy's main web site.

=== How yProxy works ===
yProxy is a non-transparent NNTP proxy server. A NNTP client connects to yProxy. yProxy connects to the NNTP server. When the NNTP client makes a request for a news article, yProxy passes the request directly to the server. When the server responds with a yEnc encoded attachment, yProxy will decode the yEnc attachment to its raw binary form and reencode the attachment using the older, more widely accepted UUE format before passing the attachment to the client. The client then handles the attachment normally.

Below is a textual diagram of how yProxy works for the downstream from the NNTP server to the NNTP client.

(NNTP Client) <=UUE= (yProxy) <=yEnc= (NNTP Server)

== yProxy Pro ==
yProxy Pro was initially released in October, 2004 and is no longer freeware.

yProxy Pro added new features such as:

1. Full compliance with yEnc v1.3 standards
2. Support for secure NNTP connections via SSL
3. Thread priority control
4. Support for Windows 7 and Windows Live Mail
5. Decodes yEnc encoded attachments and sends them to client as UU encoded
6. Monitoring of connections
7. Automatic progress indicator for single or multipart posts
8. Automatic configuration and testing of Outlook Express, Windows Mail, Windows Live Mail, or Mozilla Thunderbird accounts
