= Leecher (computing) =

One who benefits from others' effort without giving in return

In computing and specifically in Internet slang, a leech is one who benefits, usually deliberately, from others' information or effort but does not offer anything in return, or makes only token offerings in an attempt to avoid being called a leech. In economics, this type of behavior is called "free riding" and is associated with the free rider problem. The term originated in the bulletin board system era, when it referred to users that would download files and upload nothing in return.

Depending on context, leeching does not necessarily refer to illegal use of computer resources, but often instead to greedy use according to etiquette: to wit, using too much of what is freely given without contributing a reasonable amount back to the community that provides it. The word is also used without any pejorative connotations, simply meaning to download large sets of information: for example the Usenet newsreader NewsLeecher.

The name derives from the leech, an animal that sucks blood and then tries to leave unnoticed. Other terms are used, such as "freeloader", "mooch" and "sponge", but leech is the most commonly used.

== Examples ==
- Wi-Fi leeches attach to open wireless networks without the owner's knowledge in order to access the Internet. One example of this is someone who connects to a café's free wireless service from their car in the parking lot in order to download large amounts of data. Piggybacking is a term used to describe this phenomenon.
- Direct linking (or hot-linking) is a form of bandwidth leeching that occurs when placing an unauthorized linked object, often an image, from one site in a web page belonging to a second site (the leech).
- In most P2P-networks, leeching can be defined as behavior consisting of downloading more data, over time, than the individual is uploading to other clients, thus draining speed from the network. The term is used in a similar way for shared FTP directories. Mainly, leeching is taking without giving.
- Claiming credit for, or offering for sale, freely available content created and uploaded by others to the Internet (Plagiarism/Copyfraud)

== Gaming ==
In games (whether a traditional tabletop RPG, LARPing, or even MMORPG) the term "leech" is given to someone who avoids confrontation and sits out while another player fights and gains experience for the person, or "leecher", who is avoiding confrontation.

- In online multi-player games, "to leech" generally means that a player be present and qualify for the presentation of a reward of some sort, without contributing to the team effort needed to earn that reward. Although in the past the term "leeching" has been applied to a player gaining any benefit due solely to the efforts of others, the term is now most often limited to players that gain experience without meaningful contribution. However, while this usually carries negative connotations, this is not always the case; for instance, in MMOs where power leveling is possible, a higher level player may deliberately consent to a lower leveled player gaining experience without assisting, usually due to the danger to the lower leveled player. In situations where the amount of assistance the lower level player can provide is negligible (as is often the case when being Power Leveled, due to the disparity between target mobs and the player), a higher level player may deliberately encourage the lower level player to "leech" to avoid wasted time spent protecting the lower level player that could otherwise be directed towards more quickly accomplishing the goal of earning experience points. However, this is usually an arrangement between friends or guild-mates, and unsolicited requests to "leech" experience off of a higher level player is often considered extremely rude.
- In popular MMORPG's the alternative way to refer to a "leecher" (especially one that is "leeching" items, as opposed to experience) has arisen as being "Ninja" (referring to the notional lightning reflexes needed to claim the reward between its appearance and its retrieval by the more deserving player). This can be used as either a noun ("Player One is a loot ninja!") or a verb ("Player One keeps ninja'ing all the drops!"). However, a "ninja" may not necessarily be "leeching", in that they do sometimes contribute to the goal, "ninja" more applies towards a player claiming an item unfairly, either because the group agreed to pass the item to a particular player in advance, or by taking the item before the group can determine which player gets the item fairly through whichever process the group agreed upon (usually rolling for it, which is simulated in many MMOs through a "/random" or "/roll" command).
- This is different from "kill stealing" where a player uses an attack at the right moment to kill an enemy and take the experience benefit (XP), which may benefit the player or not. In some games, XP is granted to the person who deals a final shot to an enemy, or to who deals a significant amount of damage regardless of who hit it last. Kill stealing can in this fashion be applied as a reverse leeching: it prevents another player from gaining XP at all regardless of their effort.

== Prevention ==
- Since the BBS era of the 1980s and early 1990s, many systems have implemented a ratio policy, which requires the upload of a certain amount for every amount downloaded. This continues to be found in the internet era, in systems such as BitTorrent.
- Wi-Fi networks can implement various authentication and access control technologies in order to prevent leeching. The most common are client MAC address authorization tables (deprecated due to insecurity), Wired Equivalent Privacy (deprecated due to insecurity), and Wi-Fi Protected Access.
- Bandwidth leeching can be prevented by running an anti-leeching script on the website's server. It can automatically ban IPs that leech, or can redirect them to faulty files.

== P2P networks ==
Amongst users of the BitTorrent file distribution protocol and common P2P networks, such as the eDonkey network or Gnutella2, a leech is a user who disconnects as soon as they have a complete copy of a particular file, while minimizing or completely suppressing data upload.

However, on most BitTorrent tracker sites, the term leecher is used for all users who are not seeders (which means they do not have the complete file yet). As BitTorrent clients usually begin to upload files almost as soon as they have started to download them, such users are usually not freeloaders (people who don't upload data at all to the swarm). Therefore, this kind of leeching is considered to be a legitimate practice. Reaching an upload/download ratio of 1:1 (meaning that the user has uploaded as much as they downloaded) in a BitTorrent client is considered a minimum in the etiquette of that network. In the terminology of these BitTorrent sites, a leech becomes a seeder (a provider of the file) when they have finished downloading and continue to run the client. They will remain a seeder until the file is removed or destroyed (settings enable the torrent to stop seeding at a certain share ratio, or after X hours have passed seeding).

The so-called bad leechers are those running specially modified clients which avoid uploading data. This has led to the development of a multitude of technologies to ban such misbehaving clients. For example, on BitTorrent, most private trackers do keep track of the amount of data a client uploads or downloads to avoid leeching, while on real P2P networks systems like DLP (Dynamic Leecher Protection) (eMule Xtreme Mod, eDonkey network) or uploader rewarding (Gnutella2) have been brought in place. Note that BitTorrent is not a P2P network, it is only a P2P file distribution system.

Leeching is often seen as a threat to peer-to-peer sharing and as the direct opposite of the practice of seeding. But with rising downloads, uploads are still guaranteed, although few contributors in the system account for most services.

== See also ==
- Free-rider problem
- LeechModem
- Lurker
- Parasitism (social offense)
- Tragedy of the commons
