= Ratting =

Ratting may refer to:

- Ratter (dog), dog used for catching and killing rats
- Rat-catcher, the profession of catching rats
- Rat-baiting, the bloodsport of dogs catching rats
- Informant, telling on people
- Backcombing, a method of styling hair to add volume
- Leecher (computing), alternative term usually used in video games
- The use of a remote access trojan for malicious purposes
