= SmartPAR =

Freeware data recovery application

- Stable release: 0.13d1 / January 22, 2002; 23 years ago
- Operating system: Microsoft Windows
- Platform: x86
- Type: Data recovery
- License: Proprietary

SmartPAR is a freeware application for Microsoft Windows for working with Parchive format parity files. It supports the original Par1 (PAR) format and uses Reed-Solomon error correction to create new recovery files. SmartPAR is able to correct errors and recover missing parts of distributed files from PAR files.
