= Web-based Usenet =

Usenet, a worldwide distributed Internet discussion system, can be accessed through web browsers as well as through dedicated news clients.

== Introduction ==
Usenet newsgroups are traditionally accessed by a newsreader. The user must obtain a news server account and a newsgroup reader. With web-based Usenet, all of the technical aspects of setting up an account and retrieving content are alleviated by allowing access with one account. The content is made available for viewing via any web browser.

== Setup and access ==
The browser interface offered by web-based Usenet providers is typically known as a Usenet browser. When binary content is supported, it is already compiled and ready for viewing. Normally, they will have a thumbnail format for their images and videos to make browsing much faster and simpler. Typically, there is no setup for web-based Usenet. It is as easy as navigating through a browser to the provider's web site. Web-based Usenet is especially useful for those who have access to the internet but do not have, or do not know how to set up, a traditional newsreader.

== Web-based sites and popularity ==
Google Groups was the most popular and by far the largest web-based Usenet archive (consisting of over 700 million posts dating from as early as 1981) until its advanced search functionality became nonfunctional in February 2015. It discontinued Usenet operation in 2024. As of May 2017, Easynews appears to be the only regularly updated and reliable way to access newsgroups through a web browser.

As of August 2025, the following text-only web-based Usenet sites also exist. All are free to access but require registration to post:

- Narkive (read-only)
- Nemo (read/write, UI in French)
- Newsgrouper (read/write), software available
- novaBBS (read/write, limited set of groups carried), software available - stopped operating in July 2025.
- Go-Pugleaf (read/write, limited set of groups carried) - stopped operating in January 2026.
- CSIPH.com (read/write)
