= NZB =

XML-based file format

NZB file format
- Filename extension: .nzb
- Internet media type: application/x-nzb
- Developed by: NewzBin
- Latest release: 1.1; November 10, 2009; 15 years ago
- Type of format: Usenet extender
- Extended from: XML
- Open format?: yes
- Website: NZB file specification

NZB is an XML-based file format for retrieving posts from NNTP (Usenet) servers. The format was conceived by the developers of the Newzbin.com Usenet Index. NZB is effective when used with search-capable websites. These websites create NZB files out of what is needed to be downloaded. Using this concept, headers would not be downloaded hence the NZB method is quicker and more bandwidth-efficient than traditional methods.

Each Usenet message has a unique identifier called the "Message-ID". When a large file is posted to a Usenet newsgroup, it is usually divided into multiple messages (called segments or parts) each having its own Message-ID. An NZB-capable Usenet client will read all needed Message-IDs from the NZB file, download them and decode the messages back into a binary file (usually using yEnc or Uuencode).

== File format example ==
The following is an example of an NZB 1.1 file.

<?xml version="1.0" encoding="iso-8859-1" ?>
<!DOCTYPE nzb PUBLIC "-//newzBin//DTD NZB 1.1//EN" "http://www.newzbin.com/DTD/nzb/nzb-1.1.dtd">
<nzb xmlns="http://www.newzbin.com/DTD/2003/nzb">
 <head>
   <meta type="title">Your File!</meta>
   <meta type="tag">Example</meta>
 </head>
 <file poster="Joe Bloggs <bloggs@nowhere.example>;" date="1071674882" subject="Here's your file!  abc-mr2a.r01 (1/2)">
   <groups>
     <group>alt.binaries.newzbin</group>
     <group>alt.binaries.mojo</group>
   </groups>
   <segments>
     <segment bytes="102394" number="1">123456789abcdef@news.newzbin.example.com</segment>
     <segment bytes="4501" number="2">987654321fedbca@news.newzbin.example.com</segment>
   </segments>
 </file>
</nzb>

== See also ==
- Comparison of Usenet newsreaders
