= Slrn =

News reader software

slrn
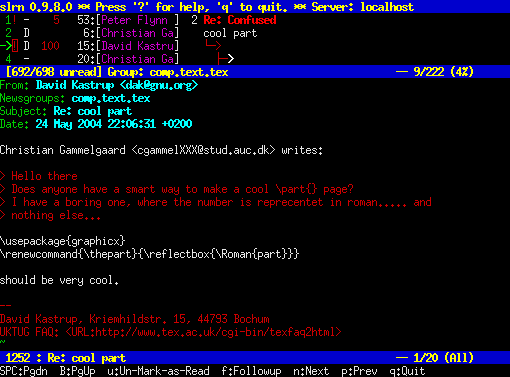
- slrn 0.9.8.0 screenshot
- Initial release: 1994; 32 years ago
- Written in: C
- Operating system: Cross-platform (Unix-like, Microsoft Windows)
- Type: News reader
- License: GPL-2.0-or-later
- Website: slrn.info

slrn is a console-based news client for multiple operating systems, developed by John E. Davis and others. It was originally developed in 1994 for Unix-like operating systems and VMS, and now also supports Microsoft Windows. It supports scoring rules to highlight, sort or kill articles based on information from their header. It is customizable, allows free key-bindings and can be extended using the S-Lang macro language. Offline reading is possible by using either slrnpull (included with slrn) or a local newsserver (like leafnode or INN). slrn is free software.

slrn was maintained by Thomas Schultz from 2000 to 2007, with the help of others who made contributions, but development is now again followed by the original author, John E. Davis. Current development focuses on better support for different character sets and tighter integration of the S-Lang language processor. Version 1.0.0 of slrn was released on December 21, 2012, 18 years after the first release. The latest release is 1.0.3 on October 23, 2016. Historically slrn was the starting point for many Usenet users. slrn is still a compromise between features, resource usage and simplicity.

== Operation ==
slrn is fully controlled with the keyboard, and new messages are composed with an external text editor.

== Name ==
The slrn name derives from the use of S-Lang and its function to read news.

== See also ==
- List of Usenet newsreaders
- Comparison of Usenet newsreaders
- List of free and open-source software packages
