= NewsWatcher =

NewsWatcher was a series of freeware and open source newsreader software for Apple Macintosh computer systems. Running on System software versions 7.0 until 10.5, the original NewsWatcher was written by Steve Falkenberg and John Norstad, and later forked by others into a number of versions such as MT-NewsWatcher (Multithreaded NewsWatcher), VA-NewsWatcher (Value Added NewsWatcher) and YA-NewsWatcher (Yet Another NewsWatcher).

Version 2.0b24 of the original NewsWatcher was evaluated for the Good Netkeeping Seal of Approval, but did not receive it, with the evaluator noting as its "fatal flaw" that the application allowed posting from invalid email addresses. John Norstad revised the application and it later received the award, earning seal #00002. These revisions were later picked up by derived versions, enabling them to also pass the evaluation.

Varieties of Newswatcher were included in popular internet starter kits of the early 1990s such as Adam Engst's Internet Starter Kit book/cd combo, which called NewsWatcher "fast, clean, and easy to use, which is the result of nice touches at every level".

The latest developed version was MT-NewsWatcher (MTNW), which was reviewed in 2002 by MacWorld, which noted its use "almost since the dawn of the Macintosh's use on the internet". MT-NewsWatcher was discontinued when the Open Transport software library it used became unsupported after Apple discontinued the Rosetta compatibility library.

== See also ==
- List of Usenet newsreaders
- Comparison of Usenet newsreaders
