= Gmane =

Website

- Owner: Yomura
- Creator: Lars Magne Ingebrigtsen
- Website: gmane.io
- Launched: 2002
- Current status: Moved to news.gmane.io

Gmane (pronounced "mane") is an e-mail to news gateway. It allows users to access electronic mailing lists as if they were Usenet newsgroups, and also through a variety of web interfaces. Since Gmane is a bidirectional gateway, it can also be used to post on the mailing lists. Gmane is an archive; it never expires messages (unless explicitly requested by users). Gmane also supports importing list postings made prior to a list's inclusion on the service.

The project was initiated in 2001 by Lars Magne Ingebrigtsen, one of the authors of Gnus, a newsreader for Emacs. It began operating publicly on 11 February 2002 after a one-month test period.

As of 18 February 2012, Gmane's homepage stated that it included 129,592,482 messages in its archives, from a total of 20,070 mailing lists.

In July 2016, Ingebrigtsen announced that he was considering shutting Gmane down, and the web interface was taken offline. In August 2016 Gmane was acquired by Yomura Holdings. Only the message spool was transferred, with the software behind the site having to be redeveloped. On 6 September 2016, it was announced that the Gmane web interface would be coming online again. However, by February 2018 a LWN.net article observed that the web interface did "never [...] return, breaking thousands of links across the net. The front page still says 'some things are very broken' and links to a blog page that was last updated in September 2016."

In January 2020, the server hosting the email-to-news service, still operated by Ingebrigtsen, was relocated following the sale of a company he had co-founded. Due to the failure of the domain owners to update a DNS entry, Ingebrigtsen migrated the 15,000 mailing lists to a replacement domain, gmane.io, using a combination of automation and volunteer labor. As of 2025, the service remains available via newsreader, though the searchable web archive formerly operated by Yomura has not been restored; the gmane.io website currently provides only a basic administrative interface for list management.

== Example ==
wikien-l is an electronic mailing list for discussion concerning the English-language Wikipedia. Via the standard email interface, users post messages by emailing them to wikien-l@lists.wikimedia.org, and these are forwarded by email to everyone who subscribes to the list.

Gmane permits users to access this mailing list as if it were a Usenet newsgroup instead, by using the news server news.gmane.io and group name gmane.science.linguistics.wikipedia.english. Messages posted to the list by email will appear in the Gmane newsgroup, and vice versa.

== Spam protection ==
Incoming mail is checked by SpamAssassin and anti-virus software so that spam and viruses are hidden or deleted. Outgoing mail is checked by TMDA to make sure that no spam will be posted to the lists using Gmane.

== Other list-archiving services ==
Other services which can archive mailing lists include The Mail Archive, Nabble, MarkMail, MARC, MailBrowse, the old Google Groups user interface (the interface which was standard until 2012), Gossamer Threads, and OpenSubscriber.
