= Unison (Usenet client) =

Usenet client for macOS

- Developer: Panic
- Stable release: 2.2 / 5 November 2014
- Operating system: Mac OS X
- Type: Usenet client
- License: Proprietary
- Website: Panic.com/unison/

Unison was a shareware Mac OS X client for Usenet, developed by Panic Software. It required access to a news server and supports binary file downloading (including NZB support), group browsing and segmenting and error checking utilities. The software won the Apple Design Award for Best Mac OS X User experience in 2004, as well as being a runner-up in the "Best product" category.

On 6 November 2014, Panic Software announced, with the release of version 2.2, that all further work on Unison had been discontinued. Unison is still available for download and no longer requires a purchased license; however, it is unsupported by Panic.

It was also a Usenet newsreader.

== History ==
Unison 1.0 was released in 2004.

Unison 2.0 was released on January 5, 2010.

== See also ==
- Panic
- List of Usenet newsreaders
- Comparison of Usenet newsreaders
