= Forté Agent =

Email and Usenet client software

- Developer: Forté Internet Software
- Release: 1994; 32 years ago
- Stable release: 8.0 / October 20, 2014
- Preview release: None [±]
- Operating system: Windows
- Type: News client
- License: Proprietary commercial software
- Website: Forté Internet Software

Forté Agent is an email and Usenet news client used on the Windows operating system. Agent was conceived, designed and developed by Mark Sidell and the team at Forté Internet Software in 1994 to address the need for an online/offline newsreader which capitalized on the emerging Windows GUI framework. By 1995, Agent had expanded to become a full-featured email client and remains a widely used application for integrating news and email communication on Windows. Agent supports POP email but not IMAP.

Agent's Usenet features include access to multiple news servers, import/export of NZB files, threaded discussions and a highly configurable user interface which has been criticized as difficult to use. It has long supported yEnc as well as many other coding schemes, and has the capability of joining incomplete binary attachments, which is useful in the event of posting errors.

In the past, a free version, Free Agent, was offered alongside the commercial one. Free Agent lacked some features of the commercial version or, later, had them disabled until a registration key was entered. The last free version was 3.3.

== Forté Internet Software ==
Forté Internet Software
- Type: Private
- Industry: Software
- Founded: 1987
- Founder: Charles Dazler Knuff
- Headquarters: Carlsbad, California, United States
- Key people: Charles Dazler Knuff, President and CEO
- Products: Forté Agent
- Website: www.forteinc.com

Originally called Forte Advanced Management Systems, Forté Internet Software, produced in the 1980s and 1990s enterprise-level products including network optimization and station administration tools that were licensed by Nortel Networks. In 1996, Forté created Adante, software for managing high volumes of inbound corporate email.

In late 1997, Forté was acquired by Genesys Telecommunications (which was then purchased by Alcatel) to integrate Adante into the Genesys and Alcatel product lines. In 2000, Alcatel sold Forte's Consumer Software Group to Charles Dazler Knuff. Now known as Forté Internet Software, this group continues to develop Agent and to research the areas of social software, email and wireless communications using trust networks.

In 2003, Forté created Forté Internet Services, which offers Agent Premium Newsgroups (APN), a high-speed, high-retention Usenet news service.

== See also ==
- List of Usenet newsreaders
- Comparison of Usenet newsreaders
