= Easynews =

HW Media Usenet/newsgroup reseller

- Company type: Private
- Industry: Telecommunications
- Products: Usenet
- Website: www.easynews.com

Easynews, Inc is a HW Media Usenet/newsgroup reseller. Founded in 1994, Easynews service is available to individual users through a subscription model and as an outsourced service to internet service providers. Easynews offers Usenet access both through traditional Network News Transfer Protocol (NNTP) servers as well as a web interface using a standard web browser.

In 2006, Easynews was bought out by Highwinds Media, and their infrastructure merged. This move dramatically increased retention for all Easynews customers.

== History ==
Easynews and HW Media continue to develop additional infrastructure to improve the web interface performance. This infrastructure includes: Zip Manager (2001), Global Search (2003), Auto Unrar (2005), Auto Par (2005), and Easyboost (2009). According to Sameh Ghane's TOP1000, Highwinds Media (the Usenet service which Easynews resells) is consistently within the top 10 of all Usenet servers. In 1997, Easynews implemented SSL encryption as an optional service feature for all customers. On September 17, 2014, Easynews announced that the binary retention time is 2224 days for NNTP and 1810 days for web accessed articles. NNTP retention is now rolling day for day, so as each day passes NNTP retention will grow by 1 day.
