= Seeding (computing) =

Sharing of an already downloaded file in a peer-to-peer network

In computing, and specifically peer-to-peer file sharing, seeding is the uploading of already downloaded content for others to download from. A peer, a computer that is connected to the network, becomes a seed when having acquired the entire set of data, it offers its upload bandwidth to other peers attempting to download the file. This data consists of small parts so that seeds can effectively share their content with other peers, handing out the missing pieces. A peer deliberately chooses to become a seed by leaving the upload task active once the content has downloaded. The motivation to seed is mainly to keep the file being shared in circulation (as there is no central hub to continue uploading in the absence of peer seeders) and a desire to not act as a parasite. The opposite of a seed is a leech, a peer that downloads more than they upload.

This shows in a simplified way when one seeds.

== Background ==
Seeding is a practice within peer-to-peer file sharing, a content distribution model that connects computers with the use of a peer-to-peer (P2P) software program in order to share desired content. An example of such a peer-to-peer software program is BitTorrent. Peer-to-peer file sharing is different from the client–server model, where content is directly distributed from its server to a client. To make peer-to-peer file sharing function effectively, content is divided into parts of 256 kilobytes (KB). This segmented downloading makes the parts that peers are missing be transferred by seeds. It also makes downloads go faster, as content can be exchanged between peers. All peers (including seeds) sharing the same content are called a swarm.

Data shared via peer-to-peer file sharing contains shared file content, computing cycles and disk storage, among other resources.

== Motivations ==
In peer-to-peer file sharing, the strength of a swarm depends on user behaviour, as peers ideally upload more than they download. This is done by seeding, and there are different motivations to do this. There are two popular motivations to seed, of which one is the reputation-based incentive mechanism and the other is the tit for tat mechanism. As the name reveals, the former is based on the reputation of a peer, meaning that those peers who have a good reputation will get a better treatment from the uploader. The tit for tat mechanism prevents peers from downloading content if they do not upload to the peers they download from. The latter forces a peer to upload.

Although seeding is only a social norm, some scholars see the practice of uploading parts of the data bulk to others as a duty, claiming that "downloaders are forced to reward uploaders in order to compensate for their resource consumption and encourage further altruistic behaviour." Other scholars are milder and believe that a group of highly motivated seeders could already provide a notion of fairness by scheduling when to seed, uploading more effectively.

== Threats ==
Leechers, peers that download more than they upload, are a threat to peer-to-peer file sharing and the practice of seeding. Where the goal of seeding is to upload more than to download, thus contributing to the sharing of content, leechers stop uploading as soon as their download is finished. What this means is that seeders must upload more parts of the data bulk in order to guarantee a successful download for others in the swarm. Leeching is a form of "free riding" and is associated with the free rider problem, temporal downloading users that, by not seeding, do not support the distribution of content.

Although leeching is a threat to peer-to-peer sharing and an opposite of seeding, it is not regarded as an immediate problem. With downloads rising, upload is still guaranteed, though few contributors in the system account for most of the services.

== Opportunities ==
Research sees opportunities for seeding as a practice that caters contribution within peer-to-peer file sharing and the distribution of content in the digital world in general. A term for this is an economic traffic management (ETM), which is concerned with traffic management solutions to involve all peers, both seeder and leecher. It is ETM's goal to unite peers that have different objectives and to make the sharing of content with peer-to-peer file sharing more efficient. Locality awareness is raised as the most promising concepts by scholars. This entails stimulating peers to seed downloads in their neighbourhood, which speeds up the upload speed and saves inter-domain traffic over the Internet. Other opportunities that have arisen out of research are to schedule seeding and use models that reduce the power consumption of seeding computers.

== Legal issues ==
Peer-to-peer file sharing is legal, however, the platform may be also used to share illegal and pirated content. With the sharing being done between peers all over the world, there is no supervision. Control over illegal or manipulated content is therefore difficult. Seeding is a part of this and a peer can therefore be involved in helping other peers download illegal content.

One of the largest contenders against peer-to-peer or sharing in general is the Motion Picture Association of America that has led many lawsuits against peer-to-peer sharing websites. Notable examples include the Megaupload legal case and torrent websites like The Pirate Bay (see The Pirate Bay trial and The Pirate Bay raid).

== See also ==
- BitTorrent
- BitTorrent tracker
- Decentralized computing
- Distributed Data Management Architecture
- Friend-to-friend
- List of P2P protocols
- Semantic P2P networks
- Sharing economy
