= QuickPar =

- QuickPar 0.9 checking a series of RAR files for integrity.
- Developer: Peter Clements
- Release: 0.1, (February 5, 2003)
- Stable release: 0.9.1 / July 4, 2004; 22 years ago
- Operating system: Microsoft Windows
- Platform: x86
- Type: Data recovery
- License: Proprietary, Freeware
- Website: www.quickpar.org.uk

Par2 file creation screen

QuickPar is a computer program that creates parchives used as verification and recovery information for a file or group of files, and uses the recovery information, if available, to attempt to reconstruct the originals from the damaged files and the PAR volumes.

Designed for the Microsoft Windows operating system, in the past it was often used to recover damaged or missing files that have been downloaded through Usenet. QuickPar may also be used under Linux via Wine.

There are two main versions of PAR files: PAR and PAR2. The PAR2 file format lifts many of its previous restrictions. QuickPar is freeware but not open-source. It uses the Reed-Solomon error correction algorithm internally to create the error correcting information.

== Replacement ==
Since QuickPar hasn't been updated in 22 years, it is considered abandonware.

Currently, MultiPar is accepted as the software that replaces QuickPar. MultiPar is actively being developed by Yutaka Sawada.

== 64-bit versions ==
At present the command line version of QuickPar for Linux command line is available as a 64-bit version. None of the GUI versions available presently offer a 64-bit version.
