= Leafnode =

NNTP proxy server

- Original author: Arnt Gulbrandsen
- Developer: Matthias Andree
- Release: 1995
- Stable release: 1.12.0 / 26 May 2022; 4 years ago
- Written in: C
- Operating system: Unix-like
- Available in: English
- Type: Usenet server
- License: LGPLv2, ISC
- Website: www.leafnode.org

Leafnode is a store-and-forward NNTP (or Usenet) proxy server designed for small sites with just a few active newsgroups, but very easy to set up and maintain, when compared to INN. Originally created by Arnt Gulbrandsen in 1995 while he was working at Trolltech, it is currently maintained by Matthias Andree and Ralf Wildenhues.

The term leaf node can also be used to describe a node on a binary tree (or any other sort of tree that has nodes) which has no sub-nodes.
