= Spots (file sharing) =

"Spots" refer to (typically) human-created index entries, most commonly within decentralized file sharing databases such as newsgroups. A spot includes a downloadable file and accompanying metadata, and is intended to be shared with other users. While similar, a spot differs from a traditional search engine index entry in that it is typically user-generated and intended to help people (rather than an index retrieval system) identify, organize, and share content.

== Format ==
Formats vary depending on the program being used, but a spot typically contains the following information:

=== Title ===
Includes the status of a spot and the type of spot (application, media, image, etc.).

=== Spot Information ===
Includes information about the spot itself, including the user that posted the spot, the date and time a spot was created, as well as the number of views, downloads, and comments a spot has generated.

=== Content information ===
Contains information about the content within the spot. This may include a written summary of the contents, images, links to relevant web pages, language and subtitles, and category/genre info.

=== File(s) ===
The shareable file or files being referenced by the spot, including extension type, file size, and number of files.

=== User-generated content ===
User ratings and reviews, user comments, or searchable tags.
