= Ncurses =

Text-based user interface API

ncurses
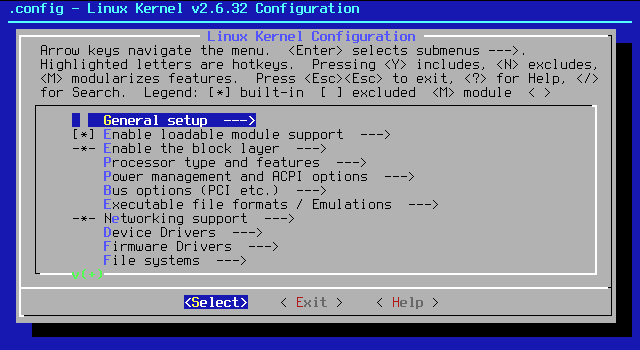
- ncurses-based menuconfig
- Developers: Thomas E. Dickey, Juergen Pfeifer, Eric S. Raymond, Alexander V Lukyanov, Philippe Blain, Sven Verdoolaege, Nicolas Boulenguez et al.
- Initial release: 1993; 33 years ago
- Stable release: 6.6 / 31 December 2025; 4 months ago
- Written in: C
- Operating system: POSIX
- Type: Widget toolkit
- License: X11
- Website: invisible-island.net/ncurses/
- Repository: invisible-mirror.net/archives/ncurses/

ncurses (new curses) is a programming library for creating textual user interfaces (TUIs) that work across a wide variety of terminals. It is written in a way that attempts to optimize the commands that are sent to the terminal, to reduce the latency experienced when updating the displayed content.

ncurses is a free and open-source software emulation of curses from System V Release 4.0 (SVr4).

There are bindings for ncurses in a variety of programming languages, including Ada, Common Lisp, Python, Gambas, Ruby, PHP, JavaScript, Perl, Object REXX (ooRexx) and Rust.

== History ==
As the new version, ncurses is a free and open-source software emulation of the System V Release 4.0 (SVr4) curses, which was an enhancement over the discontinued 4.4 BSD curses. The XSI Curses standard issued by X/Open is explicitly and closely modeled on UNIX System V.

=== curses ===
The first curses library was developed at University of California, Berkeley, for a BSD operating system, around 1980 to support Rogue, a text-based adventure game. It originally used the termcap library, which was used in other programs, such as the vi editor.

The success of the BSD curses library prompted Bell Labs to release an enhanced curses library in their System V Release 2 Unix systems. This library was more powerful and instead of using termcap, it used terminfo. However, due to AT&T's policy regarding the distribution of source code, the improved curses library was not widely adopted in the BSD community.

=== pcurses ===
Around 1982, Pavel Curtis started work on a freeware clone of the Bell Labs curses, named pcurses, which was maintained by various people through 1986.

=== ncurses ===
The pcurses library was further improved when Zeyd Ben-Halim took over the development effort in late 1991. The new library was released as ncurses in November 1993, with version 1.8.1 as the first major release. Subsequent work, through version 1.8.8 (M1995), was driven by Eric S. Raymond, who added the form and menu libraries written by Juergen Pfeifer. Since 1996, it has been maintained by Thomas E. Dickey.

Most ncurses calls can be easily ported to the old curses. System V curses implementations can support BSD curses programs with just a recompilation. However, a few areas are problematic, such as handling terminal resizing, since no counterpart exists in the old curses.

== Terminal database ==
ncurses can use either terminfo (with extensible data) or termcap. Other implementations of curses generally use terminfo; a minority use termcap. Few (mytinfo was an older exception) use both.

== License ==
ncurses is a part of the GNU Project, but is not distributed under the GNU General Public License (GPL) or GNU Lesser General Public License (LGPL). Instead, it is distributed under a permissive free software licence: the MIT License. This is due to the agreement made with the Free Software Foundation at the time the developers assigned their copyright.

When the agreement was made to pass on the rights to the FSF, there was a clause that stated:

The Foundation promises that all distribution of the Package, or of any work "based on the Package", that takes place under the control of the Foundation or its agents or assignees, shall be on terms that explicitly and perpetually permit anyone possessing a copy of the work to which the terms apply, and possessing accurate notice of these terms, to redistribute copies of the work to anyone on the same terms.

According to the maintainer Thomas E. Dickey, this precludes relicensing to the GPL in any version, since it would place restrictions on the programs that will be able to link to the libraries.

== Programs using ncurses ==
Hundreds of programs use ncurses. Some, such as GNU Screen and w3m, use only the termcap interface and perform screen management themselves. Others, such as GNU Midnight Commander and Yet another Setup Tool (YaST), use the curses programming interface.

== See also ==
- conio.h – A C header file used mostly with MS-DOS compilers to create text user interfaces
- Curses Development Kit
- Dialog (software)
- PDCurses
- S-Lang programming library
- SMG$ – Screen-management library available under OpenVMS
- GNU Readline
