= Message-ID =

Unique identifier for a digital message

Message-ID is a unique identifier for a digital message, most commonly a globally unique identifier used in email and Usenet newsgroups.

Message-IDs are required to have a specific format which is a subset of an email address and be globally unique. No two different messages must ever have the same Message-ID. If two messages have the same Message-ID, they are assumed to be the same and one version is discarded. This can cause issues if tools mangle the IDs created by other tools. Such a problem has been reported with Google MTAs mangling Message-IDs created by Outlook, making it difficult to reference other messages and breaking threading.

Message-IDs, if present, are generated by the client program sending the email or by the first mail server. A common method of generating such ID is by combining the time and domain name, for example: 950124.162336@example.com.
