= Storage model =

A storage model is a model that captures key physical aspects of data structure in a data store. On the other hand, a data model is a model that captures key logical aspects of data structure in a database. The physical storage can be a local disk, a removable media, or storage accessible via the network.
