= Network News Transfer Protocol =

Computer network protocol

- Communication protocol
- OSI layer: Application layer
- IP number: TCP
- Ports: 119 (unencrypted); 563 (secured over TLS/SSL)
- RFCs: 3977 (Current); 4642 (TLS); 6048 (Updates)

The Network News Transfer Protocol (NNTP) is an application protocol used for transporting Usenet news articles (netnews) between news servers, and for reading/posting articles by the end user client applications. Brian Kantor of the University of California, San Diego, and Phil Lapsley of the University of California, Berkeley, wrote RFC 977, the specification for the Network News Transfer Protocol, in March 1986. Other contributors included Stan O. Barber from the Baylor College of Medicine and Erik Fair of Apple Computer.

Usenet was originally designed based on the UUCP network, with most article transfers taking place over direct point-to-point telephone links between news servers, which were powerful time-sharing systems. Readers and posters logged into these computers reading the articles directly from the local disk.

As local area networks and Internet participation proliferated, it became desirable to allow newsreaders to be run on personal computers connected to local networks. The resulting protocol was NNTP, which resembled the Simple Mail Transfer Protocol (SMTP) but was tailored for exchanging newsgroup articles.

A newsreader, also known as a news client, is a software application that reads articles on Usenet, either directly from the news server's disks or via the NNTP.

The well-known TCP port 119 is reserved for NNTP. Well-known TCP port 433 (NNSP) may be used when doing a bulk transfer of articles from one server to another. When clients connect to a news server with Transport Layer Security (TLS), TCP port 563 is often used. This is sometimes referred to as NNTPS. Alternatively, a plain-text connection over port 119 may be changed to use TLS via the STARTTLS command.

In October 2006, the IETF released RFC 3977, which updates NNTP and codifies many of the additions made over the years since RFC 977. At the same time, the IETF also released RFC 4642, which specifies the use of Transport Layer Security (TLS) via NNTP over STARTTLS.

== Network News Reader Protocol ==
During an abortive attempt to update the NNTP standard in the early 1990s, a specialized form of NNTP intended specifically for use by clients, NNRP, was proposed. This protocol was never completed or fully implemented, but the name persisted in InterNetNews's (INN) nnrpd program. As a result, the subset of standard NNTP commands useful to clients is sometimes still referred to as "NNRP".

== NNTP server software ==
- Leafnode
- InterNetNews
- C News
- Apache James
- Synchronet
- yProxy
- DIABLO, a backbone news transit system, designed to replace INND on backbone machines.

== See also ==
- List of Usenet newsreaders
