= Newsreader (Usenet) =

Application that reads articles on Usenet distributed throughout newsgroups

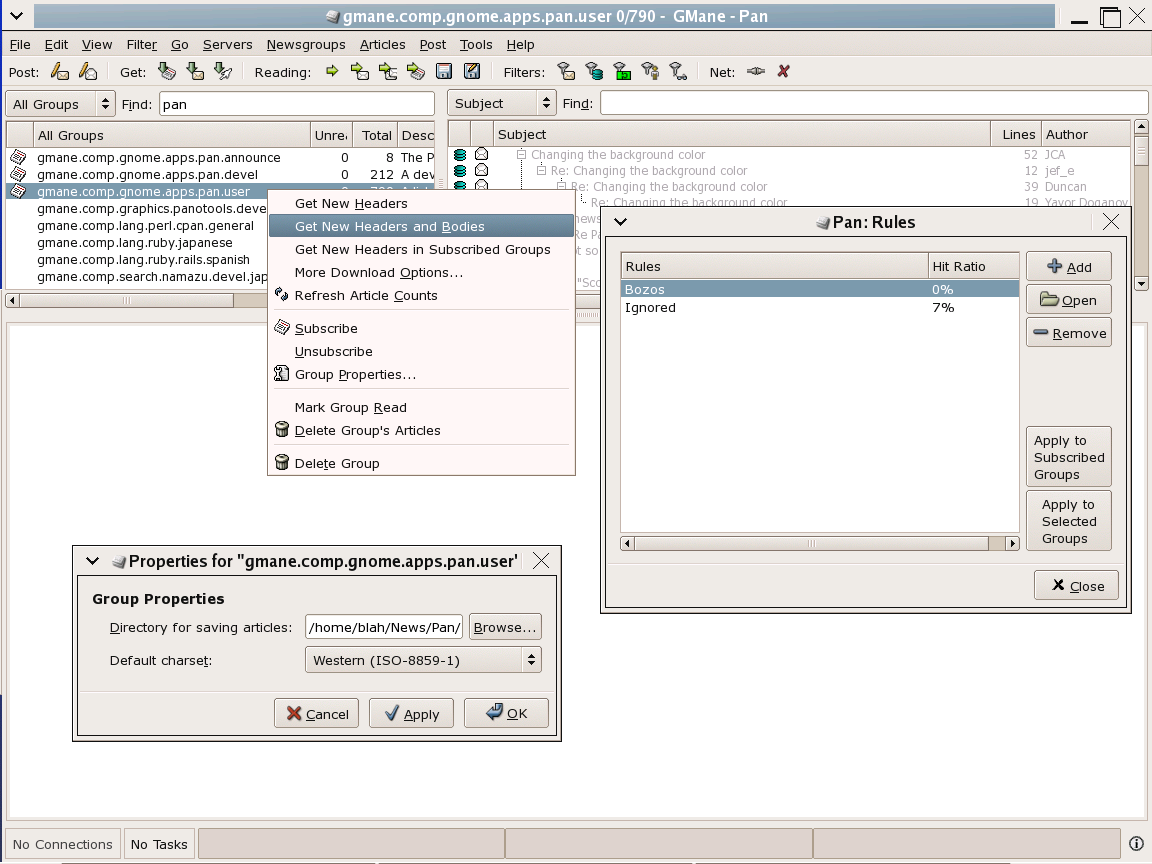
The Pan newsreader for GNOME

A newsreader is a software application that reads articles on Usenet distributed throughout newsgroups. Newsreaders act as clients which connect to a news server, via the Network News Transfer Protocol (NNTP), to download articles and post new articles. In addition to text-based articles, Usenet is also used to distribute binary files, generally in dedicated "binaries" newsgroups.

The term newsreader is sometimes (erroneously) used interchangeably with news aggregator.

Newsreaders that help users to adhere to the established conventions of Usenet, known as netiquette, are evaluated by the Good Netkeeping Seal of Approval (GNKSA).

== Types of newsreaders ==
There are several different types of newsreaders, depending on the type of service the user needs—whether intended primarily for discussion or for downloading files posted to the alt.binaries hierarchy:

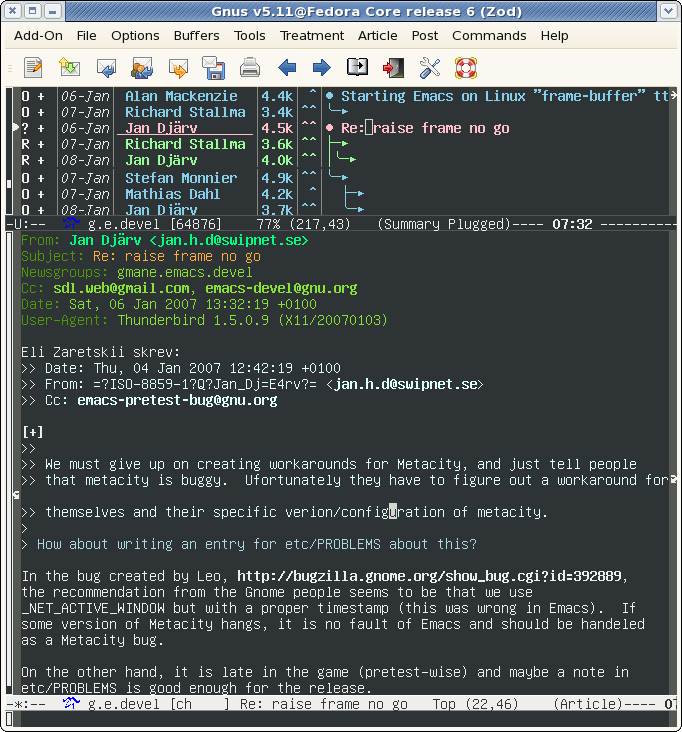
The Gnus newsreader/email client for Emacs

Desktop newsreaders
Designed to integrate well with common GUI environments, and often integrated with a web browser or email client. Examples: Windows Live Mail, Mozilla Thunderbird, Xnews, Forté Agent, Unison, Newswatcher and Pan.
Traditional newsreaders
Designed primarily for reading/posting text posts; limited and often cumbersome binary attachment download functionality. Gnus, as well as more specialized newsreaders such as slrn, nn and tin.

Binary downloaders
Although Usenet originally started as a text-based messaging system without any file attachment ability, many Usenet users today do not participate in discussion groups, as was common during the 1980s and 1990s and only use newsgroups for downloading files such as music, movies, pornography, software and games. Therefore, streamlined clients have been developed for quickly grabbing binary articles, and without the extraneous clutter of text reading and posting features for which file downloaders have little use.

== See also ==
- Comparison of Usenet newsreaders
- List of Usenet newsreaders
