= Chris Lewis (Usenet) =

Canadian computer security consultant

- Occupation: Security consultant
- Organization: SpamhausTechnology
- Known for: Volunteer "despamming" Operating cancelbots on Usenet

Christopher Lewis is a Canadian computer security consultant from Ottawa, who fought spam on Usenet and the early Internet. Active in volunteer anti-spam efforts in the late 1990s and early 2000s, Lewis was described in Net.wars (1997) as "the best known active canceler of spam and other mass postings" at the time. In April 1998, he organized an unsuccessful moratorium with forty other anti-spam volunteers in an attempt to boycott internet service providers into doing their share against spam. He worked as a systems architect for Nortel and, as of 2017, is Chief Scientist at SpamhausTechnology.

== Career ==
Lewis worked as a senior security architect at Bell Northern Research, then as a systems architect for Nortel from 1991 to 2012. In 2002, Lewis led a five-man spam-filtering team at a major telecommunications company (Note: Unnamed in the article; presumably Nortel.) with over 45,000 employees. His unofficial title was "spam issues architect", and he was conservative with the messages he filters so as not to accidentally hide potential business offers. He said at the time that, while Usenet spammers had become unsuccessful, email spammers were still prevalent. In late 2012, Nortel downsized and laid off Lewis. As of 2017, Lewis works as Chief Scientist at SpamhausTechnology, an organization targeting email spammers.

== Volunteer anti-spam efforts ==
Lewis was involved in volunteer anti-spam efforts on Usenet and operated many bots, including cancelbots, as part of these efforts. Journalists Wendy M. Grossman and Andrew Leonard describe him as "the best known active canceler of spam and other mass postings" and "one of Usenet's foremost" spam-cancelers at the time. Princeton Plasma Physics Laboratory's website called him a "[m]ajor Canadian despammer who has probably canceled more usenet abuse than anybody else."

Lewis wrote and ran Dave the Resurrector, a "resurrector bot" that reported and reposted unauthorized cancel messages in the newsgroup news.admin.net-abuse.misc, after a "particularly obnoxious run of cancels" sent by Kevin Lipsitz. The "resurrector bot" was named after Dave Hayes. In 1995, Lewis stirred controversy after he canceled messages from Austin Bastable, a voluntary euthanasia activist suffering from multiple sclerosis, because they were mass e-mails and therefore met the definition of spam. He defended his actions by saying that while he sympathized with Bastable's position, "spam is spam". In September 1996, Lewis was able to restore over 25,000 canceled posts with Dave the Resurrector after a cancelbot attacked several newsgroups on Asian and Jewish topics.

In April 1998, Lewis coordinated a strike with forty other anti-spam volunteers due to the failure of some internet service providers and websites to help implement anti-spam filters—spam and spam-canceling messages were estimated by Lewis to make up 80% of Usenet traffic at the time. However, predictions that Usenet would suffer a meltdown from spam traffic occurred only on a smaller scale, as some servers and small ISPs failing to use filters crashed. There was also a lack of "solidarity" between all volunteers, and "Cosmo Roadkill", one of their most active, continued to cancel spam regardless. The boycott was declared on March 31 by Lewis, and ended after two weeks. Lewis said that the boycott helped raise awareness towards spam and pressured smaller ISPs and newsgroup administrators into implementing filters. Some alt. newsgroups may have been lost.

Lewis co-founded CAUCE Canada, the first organization of the Coalition Against Unsolicited Commercial Email (CAUCE), alongside John Levine and Neil Schwartzman on November 30, 1998, and was later its treasurer. He was a member of the despamming group Cabal Network Security/SPUTUM.
