= Critical Path, Inc. =

Irish provider of messaging services

- Type: Privately held company
- Industry: Software
- Founded: 1997
- Fate: Acquired by Openwave (December 4, 2013)
- Headquarters: Dublin, Ireland
- Key people: Mark Palomba, CEO and Chairman; Tim Noel, CFO; Barry Twohig, EVP of Engineering
- Products: Mobile Software; Messaging Software; Anti-Abuse Software; Identity Management Software
- Revenue: $66.963 million USD (2005)
- Number of employees: 331

Critical Path was a provider of messaging services, working with mobile operators, telecommunications companies, ISPs, and enterprises. It was acquired on December 4, 2013 by Openwave Messaging. On March 2, 2016, it was announced that Synchronoss Technologies agreed to acquire Openwave Messaging.

== History ==
Critical Path, Inc. was founded in 1997 by David C. Hayden and Wayne Copeland de Geere as a provider of outsourced email service to ISPs. In 1998 they hired a new CEO, Doug Hickey and acquired Usenet provider Supernews. The company went public on March 29, 1999. The IPO was covered favorably by the trade press at the time. In early 2001, nearly two years after their IPO, a series of lawsuits against Critical Path were filed over hiring practices, accounting irregularities, and securities fraud, culminating in a management shakeup and SEC action against the company's President, David Thatcher, and other executives. Thatcher and two others pleaded guilty and were sentenced to jail terms from three months to one year. In 2005 their stock was delisted by Nasdaq.

In 2007 the company went private and in 2008 sold Supernews to Giganews.

In October 2010, Critical Path and Mirapoint, a secure enterprise messaging company, announced their decision to merge.
