= Stargate Industries =

Internet service provider in Pittsburgh, Pennsylvania

- Industry: Internet service provider
- Founded: November 1, 1994; 31 years ago
- Defunct: October 9, 2003; 23 years ago
- Fate: Chapter 11 bankruptcy, acquired by Expedient
- Headquarters: Pittsburgh, Pennsylvania, United States
- Key people: Marcus L. Ruscitto, President and CEO, Michael Ruscitto, Founder and Vice-President, Shawn McGorry, COO
- Products: Internet access (dial-up, broadband, leased line) Web hosting, Data center services, Web development
- Number of employees: about 450 (peak)

Stargate Industries, Inc. (later, Stargate Industries, LLC, and Stargate.Net, Inc.) was an Internet service provider that started in 1994, providing dial-up access in the Pittsburgh, Pennsylvania area. Stargate expanded its service territory and began offering other services as the company grew, such as dedicated Internet access using leased lines and DSL, data center services, co-location, and professional services, such as Web development. The company grew rapidly throughout the late 1990s through both organic growth and through the acquisitions of other providers, becoming the largest locally owned Internet service provider in western Pennsylvania, with customer count of nearly 100,000, and employing about 450 people at its peak.

The economic recession brought on by the dot-com crash in the early 2000s, in addition to several other factors, ultimately forced the company into bankruptcy under Chapter 11 of the United States Bankruptcy Code in 2003. The company was broken up and sold to several different buyers, including Expedient, AC Coy, and Earthlink in October of that year.

== Beginnings and early history ==
Stargate Industries was initially founded in November 1994, named after the science fiction film that was in theaters at that time, by Michael Ruscitto (a 16-year-old high school student at the time) with the help of his older brother Marcus. Michael was frustrated by the lack of reliable Internet access options available at that time, so he and his older brother Marcus decided to start their own Internet service provider. Initially, the company was run out of the Ruscitto family's home south of Pittsburgh. Marcus became Stargate's president and CEO to provide the business and finance background that was needed to grow the company. The company signed up its first dial-up customer in early 1995. Within a year, the company moved its headquarters to a building the family owned in Belle Vernon, Pennsylvania to make room for additional staff and accommodate equipment to support additional services, such as dedicated Internet access over leased lines, web hosting, and server co-location.

Original Stargate logo, in reverse, with black "STAR" lettering on a white background - used on letterhead and press releases.

Stargate provided dial-up Internet access initially by deploying physical and later virtual points of presence throughout Western Pennsylvania and expanded its service footprint to provide local dial-up access throughout the southwestern Pennsylvania Local Access and Transport Area (LATA 234). Future acquisitions would allow Stargate to begin offering dial-up, broadband, and dedicated Internet access services in northwestern Pennsylvania, and portions of West Virginia, Maryland, and Ohio.

In late 1995, Stargate applied for a public Autonomous System Number to allow it to connect to multiple Internet transit providers using BGP for redundancy. Stargate was assigned AS number 6104 by InterNIC, a predecessor to ARIN.

In 1996, Stargate hired Shawn McGorry from cable television operator Tele-Communications, Inc. (later acquired by AT&T to become AT&T Cable Services and eventually Comcast) as its COO. Around this time, Stargate acquired the customers of Netstation, a small local Internet provider. Stargate used telecommunications and data services from Incumbent Local Exchange Carrier Bell Atlantic (later becoming part of Verizon) and CLEC TCG (acquired by AT&T in 1998). Stargate co-located equipment in a TCG facility near downtown Pittsburgh to be better positioned to provide leased lines to business customers. The company began offering 24-hour technical support, which was a prominent factor in Stargate's marketing efforts, particularly as they began to court business customers more aggressively. Stargate began offering nationwide dial-up access through other ISPs that partnered with the iPass roaming service in 1997.

== Growth and acquisitions ==
Re-designed Stargate logo, used from 1997 to 1999. Includes "What Internet Service Should Be" service mark.

In January 1998, Stargate secured financing from local investment firm RRZ Capital Markets and acquired its largest local competitor USA Onramp, Inc. Stargate relocated its headquarters and USA Onramp's staff and operations into newly remodeled office space in Pittsburgh's Strip District neighborhood the following May. The acquisition roughly doubled Stargate's count of residential customers to 17,500, added a large portfolio of business customers, and also doubled its work force to roughly 50 people. The acquisition of USA Onramp also expanded Stargate's service footprint further into southwestern Pennsylvania and also provided its first presence outside of Pennsylvania, in Wheeling, West Virginia.

Prior to the acquisition of USA Onramp, Stargate purchased several servers from Sun Microsystems to provide capacity to support the combined companies' email, web hosting and news services and allow for cost efficiencies by combining those operations. The upgraded news server was ranked in the Freenix Top 1000 - a ranking of news servers based on how many messages pass through them - from late 1997 until early 2000, peaking as high as #395 in August of 1998.

The latter half of 1998 also saw Stargate acquire the domain name "stargate.net", and shortly thereafter begin using that domain for their website and all future marketing campaigns. In October, Stargate acquired the customers of Washington PA Online, a small Internet service provider in Washington, Pennsylvania.

Final Stargate logo, used from 2000 to 2003

1999 was a year of rapid growth and several acquisitions for Stargate. After securing a $15 million line of credit from Boston-based Fleet Bank in February, Stargate acquired local competitor Pittsburgh Online in June, the Pittsburgh-area customers of International Distribution and Consulting, Inc. (IDCI, acquired by PSINet in 2000) in September, regional providers ErieNet, and Intrepid Technologies in October, and InetONE in November. The latter three acquisitions expanded Stargate's service area into northwestern Pennsylvania, northeastern Ohio, eastern West Virginia, western Maryland, and central and southern West Virginia respectively. These acquisitions also boosted Stargate's customer count to roughly 70,000. Stargate also began offering SDSL services through nationwide DSL provider Northpoint Communications and ADSL services in 1999 through Bell Atlantic and Penn Telecom (later acquired by Consolidated Communications), a Pittsburgh-based Competitive Local Exchange Carrier, using Redback Networks SMS 1000/1800 and Cisco Universal Access Concentrator 6400 for service aggregation.

It was also during this time that Stargate and other local Internet service providers began lobbying officials in the City of Pittsburgh to include an open-access provision in the city's cable television franchise agreement with AT&T Cable Services (later acquired by Comcast), to allow providers other than AT&T Cable Services and @Home to offer Internet access to local cable customers. The franchise agreement was ultimately renewed with open-access provisions. Stargate later began offering cable Internet service in northwestern Pennsylvania through a partnership with Coaxial Cable TV (later acquired by Armstrong).

As was the case in the broader economy, 2000 was a year of significant growth and change for Stargate. The company crossed the 80,000 customer threshold in January. $20 million of additional funding was secured from Fleet Bank and Alta Communications in May. In June of that year, Stargate acquired CIScorp, a Pittsburgh-based IT consulting and development firm. CIScorp became Stargate's Professional Services Group (PSG) and increased Stargate's employee count by roughly 150. CIScorp's offices were relocated into Stargate's newly expanded Strip District headquarters, and Stargate's employee count peaked at about 450 during this time. Stargate also opened its first data center in Pittsburgh in the summer of 2000.

To accommodate the growth of their customer base and the organic growth of Internet traffic in general, Stargate's Internet bandwidth grew from 1.5 Mb/s (a single T1 circuit) in 1995 to over 330 Mb/s using a variety of circuits to multiple Internet transit providers and Internet Exchange Points in multiple facilities in 2003.

== Dot-com crash and recession ==
As with much of the rest of the technology industry, 2001 brought significant challenges to Stargate, as the dot-com economy began to falter and trigger a recession. In January, Stargate laid off roughly 15 people. That same month, broadband Internet provider Northpoint Communications filed for Chapter 11 bankruptcy protection. Northpoint was acquired by AT&T in March, and Northpoint's wholesale broadband network was subsequently shut down later that month. This caused a loss of service for roughly 400 Stargate residential and business customers who had broadband Internet service through Northpoint. While other local carriers such as Penn Telecom were able to provide alternate service for many of those customers, some ultimately lost their access and were forced to switch service to other Internet providers. This, coupled with customers starting to switch to less expensive providers, significantly impacted Stargate's top-line revenue. In late March, Stargate laid off about 45 employees, or roughly 10% of its work force. Around this time, Stargate also began to reduce the total number of dial-up modem ports from a peak of over 8,000, as customers began to migrate from dial-up access to broadband. In November, Stargate had roughly 90,000 residential and business customers, and employed roughly 350 people.

Despite the challenges in the wake of the dot-com crash, the company continued to grow. In early 2002, Stargate secured an additional $2.5 million in equity funding from Alta Communications, bringing Alta's total investment in Stargate to around $13 million. In May, Stargate topped a nationwide list of the 100 fastest-growing inner-city technology companies compiled by Inc. Magazine and the Initiative for a Competitive Inner City (ICIC). Later that month, Stargate was named as the winner of the American Business Ethics Awards for mid-sized (250 to 2,500 employees) companies, which were awarded by the Pittsburgh chapter of the Society of Financial Services Professionals.

Later in 2002, Stargate opted to move to a self-funded business model, where expenses were funded solely from incoming revenue, rather than taking on additional debt, since the company still had positive cash flow. All aspects of the company's operations were examined to find areas where costs could be minimized or eliminated without impacting service.

== Bankruptcy ==
While revenue began to rebound in late 2002 and into 2003, the combination of several factors forced Stargate to file for protection under Chapter 11 of the United States Bankruptcy Code in April 2003:

- The economic recession caused many businesses to reduce IT expenditures, such as Internet services. This caused many customers to switch services to lower-cost providers.
- Business customers did not adopt the Application Service Provider model to the extent that Stargate had hoped they would.
- The acquisition of CIScorp ultimately proved not to be as good of a fit to Stargate's service portfolio as was originally expected. The economic recession of the early 2000s also hurt the professional services business as customers scaled back or cancelled consulting and professional services contracts.
- Stargate needed to keep a significant amount of money in reserve in case litigation that was pending against CIScorp prior to its acquisition by Stargate was not resolved in Stargate's favor, potentially requiring Stargate to pay to settle the suits.
- The inability to re-negotiate several expensive contracts with communications carriers and other vendors saddled the company with unfavorable operating costs as the economy floundered.
- The inability to restructure the terms of several of their loans and lines of credit with investors. Many of these loans and credit lines were secured in 1999, at the height of the dot-com boom, and had terms that were unfavorable to Stargate in the aftermath of the dot-com crash. This also halted talks of a merger with an unnamed provider similar in size to Stargate
- Moving to a self-funded business model while cash-flow positive allowed Stargate to fund ongoing operations, but impacted the amount of money available to fund capital expenditures to purchase new equipment or make upgrades.

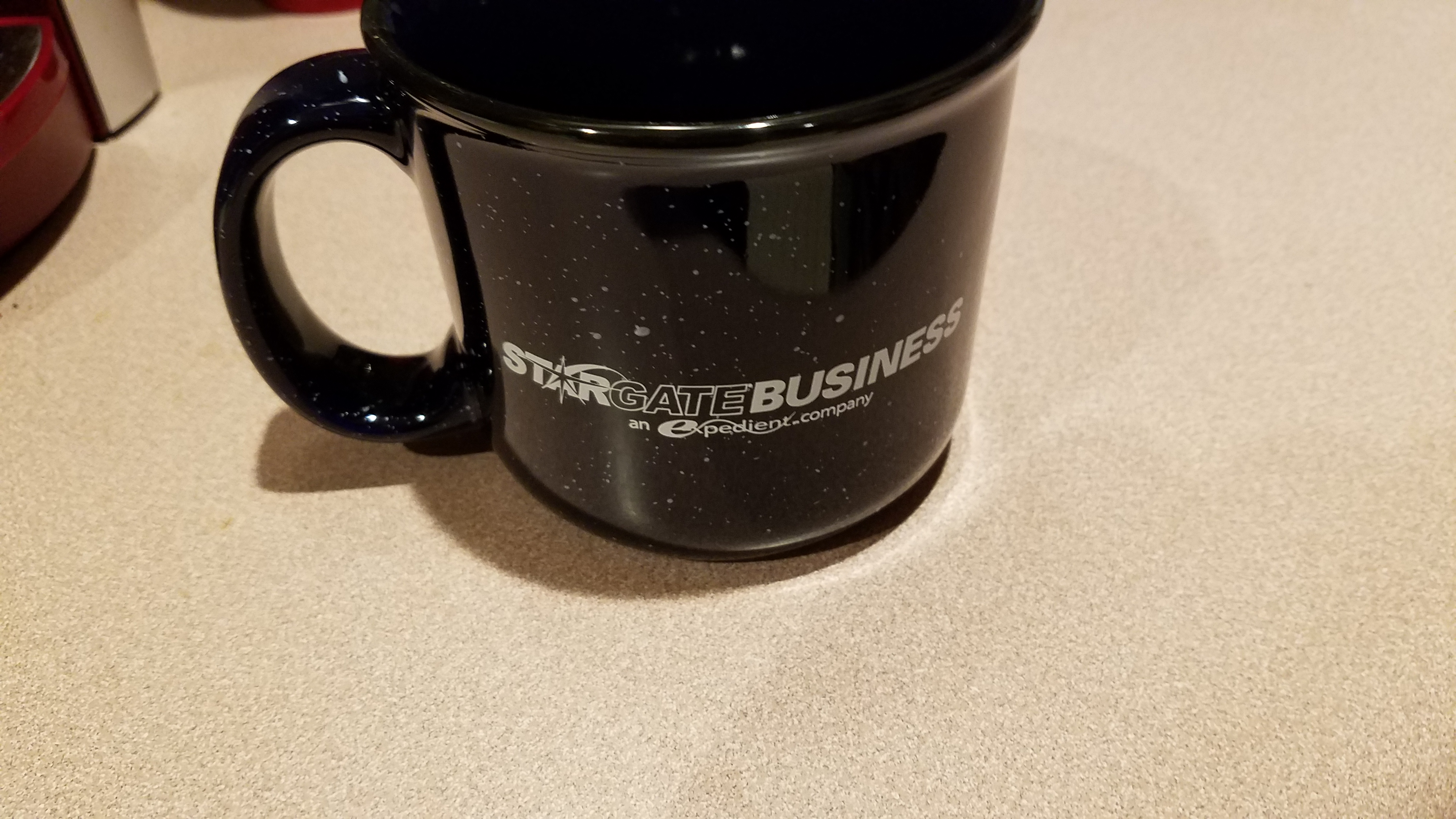
Coffee mug showing the transitional branding of Stargate Business, after that unit of Stargate Industries, LLC was acquired by Expedient in 2003.

During the bankruptcy process, it was decided that the best way to maximize the value returned to Stargate's investors and secured creditors would be split the company into three pieces and sell those pieces individually. The total purchase price for the three pieces of Stargate was about $10 million. Most residential dial-up and broadband business was sold to Earthlink, one of the largest residential Internet providers at that time. The Professional Services Group was sold to AC Coy, a Pittsburgh-based IT consulting and systems integration firm. The remaining services - mostly business customers and data center services - retained the Stargate name (referred to as Stargate Business) and were acquired by Expedient (then known as e-xpedient Holdings USA, LLC.), which was headquartered in Cleveland, Ohio. The acquisition was completed in October 2003, at which point Stargate ceased to exist as a legal entity.

In early 2004, a few months after the acquisition by Expedient closed, Marc Ruscitto opted to leave the company he ran since 1994. E-Xpedient continued using the Stargate brand for a short time while services were migrated to E-Xpedient's network. E-Xpedient moved its corporate headquarters to Stargate's offices in Pittsburgh in early 2004. By mid 2004, Expedient ceased using the Stargate brand in its marketing materials. Expedient is still in business and still headquartered in Pittsburgh.
