= Rick Adams (computer programmer) =

American internet pioneer

Richard L. Adams Jr.
- Born: Richard L. Adams Jr.
- Education: Purdue University
- Occupations: Internet pioneer, entrepreneur
- Known for: Founding UUNET; creating the first widely used SLIP implementation
- Spouse: Donnalyn Frey
- Children: 2

Richard L. "Rick" Adams, Jr. is an American internet pioneer. He is known as the founder of UUNET, which, in the mid and late 1990s, was the world's largest internet service provider (ISP). In 1997, his fortune was estimated at $500 million.

== Early life and education ==
He obtained a master's degree in computer science from Purdue University.

== Career ==
Adams was responsible for the first widely available Serial Line IP (SLIP) implementation and founding UUNET, which is known for helping make the internet widely accessible. In 1982, he ran the first international UUCP e-mail link, known as "Seismo", at the Center for Seismic Studies in Northern Virginia), which evolved into the first (UUCP-based) UUNET. He maintained B News (at that time the most popular Usenet News transport).

In 1996, he donated one million dollars U.S. to the James Randi Educational Foundation (JREF) to be used as the basis for its One Million Dollar Paranormal Challenge. He is the JREF's treasurer.

Adams co-authored the O'Reilly book !%@:: A Directory of Electronic Mail Addressing & Networks with his wife Donnalyn Frey in 1994. He is a co-author of RFC 1036, the Standard for Interchange of USENET Messages.

=== Creation of SLIP ===
In the early 1980s, 3Com's UNET Unix system could exchange TCP/IP traffic over serial lines. In 1984, Adams implemented this system on Berkeley Unix 4.2 and dubbed it SLIP. The SLIP protocol was documented in RFC 1055.

The SLIP protocol was superseded in the early 1990s, by the Point-to-Point Protocol (PPP), which is still in use.

=== Founding UUNET ===
Adams founded a nonprofit telecommunications company, UUNET Communications Service, to reduce the cost of mail and Usenet traffic sent by UUCP, particularly for rural sites in America. (UUNET was founded with a $50,000 loan from the USENIX Association, which was subsequently repaid.) UUNET became an official gateway between UUCP mail and internet email, as well as between North America and Europe. It hosted many related services, such as internet FTP access for its UUCP clients and the comp.sources.unix archives.

Adams spun out a for-profit company, UUNET Technologies, which was the first ISP in the United States. The for-profit company bought the assets of the nonprofit, repaying it with a share of the profits over the years. The nonprofit has spent that money for many UNIX-related charitable causes over the years, such as supporting the Internet Software Consortium. The for-profit ISP became a multibillion-dollar company and made an initial public offering in 1995. It was acquired by MFS (Metropolitan Fiber Systems, a wide-area optical-networking company), in 1996, which was subsequently acquired by Worldcom, which rose to challenge the largest telecommunications companies in America.

Adams left UUNET after transitioning leadership of the company to John Sidgmore in 1994. After leaving UUNET, Adams pursued opportunities as a partner in other ventures, including Cello Recording Studios and the 2941 Restaurant in Falls Church, Virginia.

=== Cello Recording Studios ===
In 1999, Adams purchased the "Western Studio" portion of Ocean Way Recording Studios in Hollywood, California, from Alan Sides and renamed it Cello Studios. Notable artists have recorded at Cello Studios, including Weezer, Rage Against The Machine, Macy Gray, Blink-182, and Red Hot Chili Peppers. Cello Studios continued under Adams' ownership until January 2005, when the business abruptly closed and filed for bankruptcy. The vacant building, threatened with demolition, was sold and reopened as EastWest Studios in 2009.

== Personal life ==
As of July 2012, he resided in Northern Virginia with his wife Donnalyn and their two sons.

== Bibliography ==
- Donnalyn Frey and Rick Adams, %@:: a directory of electronic mail addressing & networks (Sebastopol, CA : O'Reilly & Associates, 1994) ISBN 1565920465
- Another book by Rick Adams in 1993.
