= B News =

Usenet news server

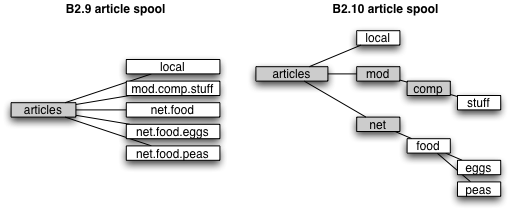
Original and hierarchical spool layouts

B News was a Usenet news server developed at the University of California, Berkeley by Matt Glickman and Mary Ann Horton as a replacement for A News. It was used on Unix systems from 1981 into the 1990s and is the reference implementation for the de facto Usenet standard described in RFC 850 and RFC 1036. Releases from 2.10.2 were maintained by UUNET founder Rick Adams.

B News introduced numerous changes from its predecessor. Articles used an extensible format with named headers, first by using labeled equivalents to the A News format. A further refinement in 1983 with News B2.10 was a move to e-mail-compatible headers, to ease message transfers with the ARPAnet. A history database was introduced, allowing articles to be placed in separate directories by newsgroup, improving retrieval speeds and easing the development of separate newsreader programs such as rn. Support was provided for expiring old articles, and control messages (special articles that can automatically cause articles to be erased, or newsgroups to be added or removed) were added.

Evolution of B News header formats
B2.9 and earlier	B2.10	B2.11
From (as UUCP path)	Path
(not used)	From (as Internet mail address)
Article-I.D.	Message-ID
Title	Subject
Posted	Date
Received	(not used)
(not used)	Relay-Version	(not used)
(not used)	Posting-Version	(not used)
(not used)		Approved

News B2.10 introduced the hierarchical article storage format carried into C News and InterNetNews, and still commonly seen in many newsreaders and cache programs. Before B2.10, all groups were stored beneath a single parent directory, impairing performance when the group list became large, and requiring that the first 14 characters be unique among all groups due to an old Unix limitation. The hierarchical layout split the groups at the periods, reducing directory sizes and ameliorating the uniqueness problem.

B2.10 contained limited support for moderated newsgroups, with posters needing to manually mail in submissions to an intermediate party who would post articles on their behalf. Moderated groups needed to be prefixed with "mod." In 1986, version B2.11 allowed moderated newsgroups to appear in any hierarchy, and it transparently mailed out moderated group submissions using the normal posting software.

The last B News patch set was released in 1989, after which Rick Adams declared the product obsolete.

About 1989, Eric S. Raymond attempted a rewrite of B News, known alternately as Teenage Mutant Ninja Netnews and News 3.0. A rough version of the software was released and drew attention from around the network, but the project was abandoned shortly thereafter.
