= Mary Ann Horton =

American computer scientist and Usenet pioneer (born 1955)

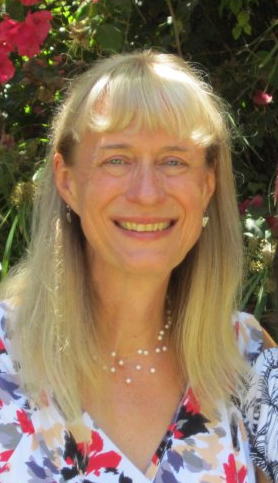
- Horton in 2012
- Born: November 21, 1955 (age 70); Richland, Washington
- Website: maryannhorton.com

Mary Ann Horton (born Mark R. Horton, November 21, 1955), is a Usenet and Internet pioneer. Horton contributed to Berkeley UNIX (BSD), including the vi editor and terminfo database, created the first email binary attachment tool uuencode, and led the growth of Usenet in the 1980s.

Horton successfully requested the first transgender-inclusive language added to the Equal Employment Policy in a large American company, and championed the language and insurance coverage of transgender health benefits at other companies.

Horton is a computer scientist and a transgender educator and activist.

== Education ==
Horton was born in Richland, Washington, and raised in the Pacific Northwest. Finding an interest in computer programming in 1970, Horton moved to San Diego County in 1971, and quickly fell in love with California. She graduated from San Dieguito High School in 1973. Earning a BSCS from the University of Southern California in 1976, Horton went on to obtain an MSCS at the University of Wisconsin, and transfer to the University of California at Berkeley in 1978, earning a PhD in Computer Science in 1981.

Horton was introduced to UNIX at Wisconsin, creating an enhanced UNIX text editor called hed. At Berkeley, she contributed to the development of Berkeley UNIX, including the vi text editor, and created uuencode (the first mechanism for binary Email attachments), w and load averages, termcap, and curses. Her PhD dissertation was the creation of a new type of syntax-directed editor with a textual interface. This technology was later used to create computer-aided software engineering tools.

In 1980, Horton brought Usenet's A News system to Berkeley and began to champion its growth from a 10-site network. To Usenet's original dialup UUCP technology, she added support for Berknet and ARPANET, and added a gateway between several popular ARPANET mailing lists and usenet "fa" newsgroups. In 1981, high school student Matt Glickman asked Horton for a spring break project, and the two designed and implemented B News, which offered major performance and user interface improvements needed to keep up with the explosive growth of Usenet traffic volume.

== UNIX and Internet work ==
In 1981, Horton became a Member of Technical Staff of Bell Labs in Columbus, Ohio. At Bell Labs she brought parts of Berkeley UNIX to UNIX System V, including vi and curses; as part of the work on curses, she developed terminfo as a replacement for termcap (most of this work shipped as part of SVR2). In 1987, she joined the Bell Labs Computation Center to bring official support for Usenet and Email to Bell Labs.

Horton continued to lead Usenet until 1988. During this time she promoted rapid growth by arranging news feeds for new sites. Each new site agreed to be the feed for two more new sites as the need arose. This policy contributed to the growth of Usenet to over 5000 sites by 1987. Horton recruited membership in and designed the original physical topology of the Usenet Backbone in 1983. Gene "Spaf" Spafford then created an email list of the backbone administrators, plus a few influential posters. This list became known as the Backbone Cabal and served as a "political (i.e. decision making) backbone". The backbone ensured the reliability and performance of the overall network.

Usenet began with only a few messages per day, but volume rapidly grew to become a problem. Horton added moderated newsgroups, distinguished with names beginning with "mod" or containing "announce", and moderated the first such newsgroup: news.announce.important. Only the moderator could post messages, all other messages were automatically sent to the moderator for approval. Eventually the B News software was enhanced to permit any newsgroup with any name to be moderated.

Usenet relied on email for replies, requiring that Usenet links could be used for email. At first, all Usenet and UUCP messages used "bang paths", such as unc!research!ucbvax!mark, as email addresses. Horton guided this email process, including the use of the ARPANET/UUCP gateway, using routed email addresses such as cbosgd!mark@berkeley. These addresses were complex, convoluted, and sometimes ambiguous. When Internet domains were first created in 1983, Horton championed their use, publishing the classic paper "What is a domain?"

At Usenix in January 1984, Horton recruited a group of volunteers to create the UUCP Mapping Project. The project divided the world into geographic regions. A volunteer for each region maintained the region's UUCP connectivity map and posted it regularly to the comp.mail.maps newsgroup. Each site ran Steve Bellovin and Peter Honeyman's pathalias program to create a locally optimized email routing database from this map. Horton worked with Chris Seiwald and Larry Auton to produce the smail program, which used this database to route email, using email addresses such as mark@cbosgd.UUCP.

In the mid 1980s, early domain use included .ARPA, .UUCP, .CSNET, and .BITNET as top level domains, representing four major email networks. In January 1986, Horton represented UUCP at a meeting to arrange technical cooperation of these networks. Others were Dan Oberst representing BITNET, Craig Partridge representing CSNET, and Ken Harrenstien, who hosted the meeting on behalf of the ARPANET. Harrenstien convinced the others to support the creation of six top level functional domains COM, EDU, ORG, NET, GOV, and MIL. Each network was authorized to register domains in COM, EDU, ORG, and NET. This group of registrars was the precursor to the ICANN domain name registry.

Horton implemented the UUCP portion of the registry by reorganizing the UUCP Project into the "UUCP Zone". With Tim Thompson, Horton registered 150 UUCP-only organizations with officially sanctioned .COM and .EDU domains. mark@stargate.com became a valid UUCP email address, even though the message was delivered via UUCP using dial-up modems.

The UUCP Zone joined with Lauren Weinstein's Stargate project, which built a pilot project to transmit Usenet over satellite television, to form Stargate Information Systems. The first domain they registered was stargate.com, the second was Horton's employer, att.com. The att.com domain connected to the Internet using dial-up modems until 1990, when Horton implemented Bill Cheswick's firewall architecture to build AT&T's first TCP/IP connection to the Internet with a demonstrably secure firewall.

Horton's 1990 book, Portable C Software became a popular reference for programming in C. It outlined functions and programming techniques that could be reliably used on many different types of computer systems, and which methods were unportable.

In 1992, Horton created an internal email package for Bell Labs called EMS (Electronic Messaging System). This package integrated the existing UUCP-based email system with the AT&T "POST" white pages directory and the domain-based email world. She created and led a supported email service for Bell Labs. This system supported many email addressing formats, including those that dynamically queried the POST directory:

- Handle: mark@att.com
- Full name: Mark.R.Horton@att.com
- Broadcast to a building: loc=oh0012/all=yes@att.com
- Complex query: all technical managers and directors in Columbus: loc=oh0012/tl=tmgr/tl=dir/all=yes@att.com

In 2000, Horton joined Avaya, where she was the Sr. Manager of Avaya Corporate Email and Directory. In 2002, Horton joined the UNIX Implementation Engineering group at Bank One, which was purchased by JPMorgan Chase in 2004. Finally fulfilling a lifelong dream, Horton moved from Columbus to San Diego in 2007, joining Sempra Energy's Transmission Grid Operations team.

== Diversity work ==
Horton is a transgender woman. Adopting the name Mary Ann in 1987, Horton founded Columbus' first transgender support group, the Crystal Club, in 1989. In 1997, she joined EQUAL, Lucent's LGBT employee resource group, and saw the value of being "out" at work, supported by an Equal Opportunity (EO) nondiscrimination policy. At the time, no major company included transgender language in their EO policy. Horton asked for its inclusion in Lucent's policy, and recommended the language "gender identity, characteristics, or expression". As a result, Lucent became the first large company to add transgender-inclusive language to its EO policy in October, 1997.

At the time, Horton identified as a crossdresser, presenting sometimes as Mark and sometimes as Mary Ann. After the Lucent EO policy was published, Horton worked at Lucent primarily as Mark, but occasionally as Mary Ann. She was the first known crossdresser to successfully work part-time as a woman for a large company. Despite controversy about the ability of corporate United States to deal with a part-time crossdresser, Horton's workplace experience was positive.

Horton championed the addition of transgender-inclusive language with other companies, supporting its addition to Apple, Xerox, Chase, and later to Bank One and Sempra Energy. The "characteristics" term was intended to include intersex individuals, but was removed after discussions with intersex activists who stated that "gender expression" best included their needs.

Horton was one of the first transgender actors to play a transgender role on television. She appeared as Aurora, a business executive, in a public service announcement advertisement for Stonewall Columbus entitled The Boardroom in June 2003.

Horton was awarded the "Trailblazer" award by Out & Equal Workplace Advocates in October 2001 for her work at Lucent and Avaya. The next week, she transitioned, presenting full-time as Mary Ann. Over the next few years, she took appropriate medical steps, and legally changed her name to Mary Ann Horton and her sex to female.

In the 1990s, most employer health insurance policies denied coverage for sex reassignment surgery (SRS) or anything related to it. Horton advocated for the inclusion of transgender health benefits (THBs) in these policies. She documented Lucent's coverage of SRS in 2000. and championed the inclusion of points for THBs in the Human Rights Campaign's Corporate Equality Index, which were added in 2005.

In 2002, Horton gathered data from 13 of 15 major SRS surgeons to determine incidence, intrinsic prevalence, and average cost of SRS-related surgeries. This data, presented at the Out & Equal Annual Workplace Summit showed that the cost of THB coverage, previously believed to be very high, was actually very low, less than 18 cents per US resident per year. This data, combined with the HRC CEI points, has led to increased coverage of THBs by large employers.

On October 28, 2022, the 25th anniversary of Lucent's nondiscrimination policy, Horton released a memoir, Trailblazer: Lighting the Path for Transgender Equality in Corporate America recounting her life as a transgender woman and as a trans activist.

== Current status ==
Horton currently resides in Poway, California.

Horton is retired from Sempra Energy as a Principal EMS Programmer/Analyst. (In this case, EMS stands for energy management system, a SCADA control system.)

Horton is also a keynote speaker and author. She owns Red Ace Technology Solutions, providing discounted web hosting services to nonprofit organizations and small businesses.
