= Supernews =

Supernews may refer to:

- SuperNews!, an animated television series
- Supernews (Usenet provider)
