= Textfiles =

Textfiles may refer to:

- Text files, computer files of text
- textfiles.com, an archive of text files
