= Cancelbot =

Automated process for sending out third-party cancel messages over Usenet

A cancelbot is an automated or semi-automated process for sending out third-party cancel messages over Usenet, commonly as a stopgap measure to combat spam.

== History ==
One of the earliest uses of a cancelbot was by microbiology professor Richard DePew, to remove anonymous postings in science newsgroups. Perhaps the most well known early cancelbot was used in June 1994 by Arnt Gulbrandsen within minutes of the first post of Canter & Siegel's second spam wave, as it was created in response to their "Green Card spam" in April 1994. Usenet spammers have alleged that cancelbots are a tool of the mythical Usenet cabal.

== Rationale ==
Cancelbots must follow community consensus to be able to serve a useful purpose, and historically, technical criteria have been the only acceptable criteria for determining if messages are cancelable, and only a few active cancellers ever obtain the broad community support needed to be effective.

Pseudosites are referenced in cancel headers by legitimate cancelbots to identify the criteria on which a message is being canceled, allowing administrators of Usenet sites to determine via standard "aliasing" mechanisms which criteria that they will accept third-party cancels for.

Currently, the generally accepted criteria (and associated pseudosites) are:

| Pseudosite | Criterion |
|---|---|
| Breidbart Index above the cancel threshold for the group or hierarchy | cyberspam!usenet |
| "Make money fast" schemes | mmfcancel!cyberspam!usenet |
| "Spew" (large number of nonsense or repeated postings) | spewcancel!cyberspam!usenet |
| Binary files posted to a group that doesn't allow them | bincancel!cyberspam!usenet |
| Retromoderation (only applies to groups that have a retromoderation policy in place) | retromod!cyberspam!usenet |
| Ad cancels within the biz.* hierarchy | adcancel!cyberspam!usenet |
| Messages originating from sites or networks under active Usenet Death Penalty (UDP) sanction by the community; the UDP is exceedingly rare, requiring a broad consensus that a Usenet site is acting in a manner generally harmful to the community, and active cancellation under a UDP is even rarer still | sitenameudp!udpcancel!cyberspam!usenet |

By general convention, special values are given in X-Canceled-By, Message-Id and Path headers when performing third-party cancels. This allows administrators to decide which reasons for third-party cancellation are acceptable for their site:

- The $alz convention states that the Message-Id: header used for a third-party cancel should always be the original Message-Id: with "cancel." prepended.
- The X-Canceled-By: convention states that the operator of a cancelbot should provide a consistent, valid, and actively monitored contact email address for their cancelbot in the X-Canceled-By: header, both to identify the canceler, and to provide a point of contact in case something goes wrong or questions arise regarding the cancelbot's operations.
- The !cyberspam convention states that specific pseudosites should be given within the cancel message's Path to identify them as complying with certain cancel criteria, see above.

== See also ==
- Dave the Resurrector
