= John W. Sidgmore =

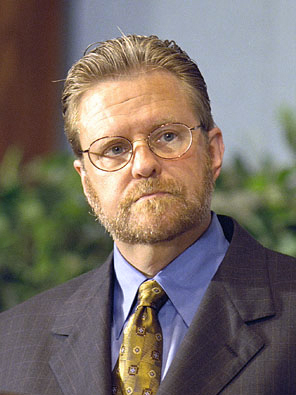
- Sidgmore in 2002
- Born: April 9, 1951
- Died: December 11, 2003 (aged 52)
- Education: State University of New York at Oneonta
- Occupation: Corporate executive
- Spouse: Randi Sidgmore
- Children: 1

John W. Sidgmore (April 9, 1951 – December 11, 2003) was a corporate executive.

He became the Chief Executive Officer of UUNET Technologies in June 1994. UUNET was purchased by MFS, later taken over by WorldCom, which eventually bought MCI. He later became WorldCom's Chief Operations Officer. Sidgmore worked to revive WorldCom after disgraced CEO Bernard Ebbers left. Sidgmore was instrumental in beginning to turn around the failed company, revealing to federal investigators an $11 billion accounting fraud, left over from Ebbers' management of the company.

John Sidgmore died suddenly on December 11, 2003, at the age of 52 from kidney failure. He is survived by his wife Randi, and their son, Michael.

== Early life ==
A native of Spring Valley, New York, he attended the State University of New York at Oneonta, majoring in economics.
