= Dave the Resurrector =

Usenet bot

Dave the Resurrector was a so-called "resurrector bot" that responded to any attempts at canceling a message on the Usenet newsgroup news.admin.net-abuse by re-posting the message. It was written by Chris Lewis.

The bot is notable as one of the first escalations in the spam arms race.

== See also ==
- Cancelbot, a process that sends out cancel messages
