= Telehack =

ARPANET simulation

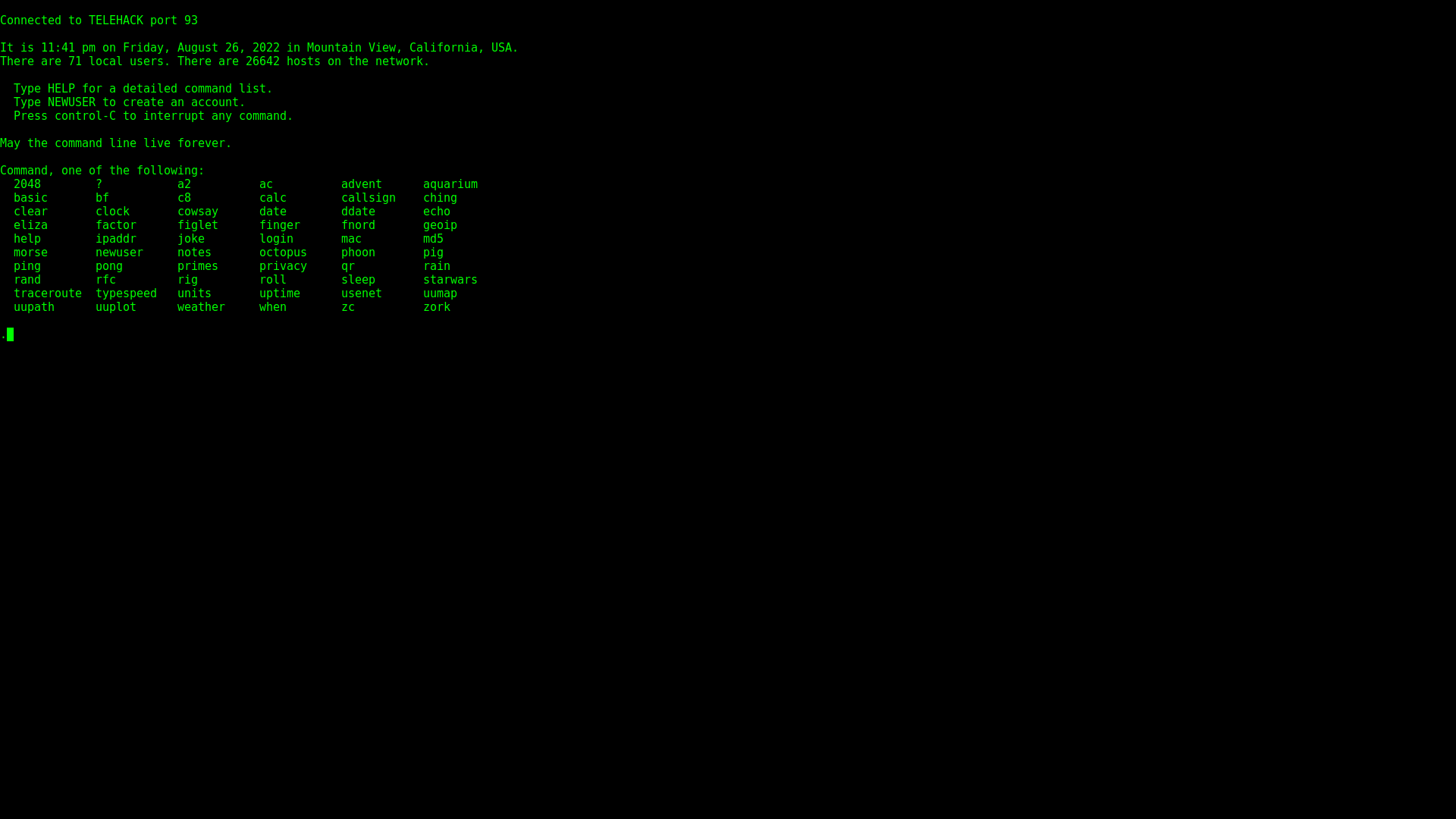
- Telehack open in a web browser
- Website type: Simulation of ARPANET and Usenet
- Available in: English
- Creators: Anonymous, under the handle "Forbin"
- Website: telehack.com
- Registration: Optional
- Users: More than 50,000
- Launched: March 7, 2010; 16 years ago
- Current status: Active
- Written in: Perl

Telehack is an online simulation of a stylized interface for ARPANET and Usenet, created anonymously in 2010. It is a multi-user simulation in which participants share a common environment, and contains roughly 26,600 simulated hosts holding period files, programs, games and bulletin board systems, depicting the network as it stood between 1985 and 1990.

Users can connect via Telnet, SSH or in a web browser to explore an archive of files, documents, scripts and newsgroup posts saved from BBSes, drawn largely from textfiles.com.

== Development ==
Telehack is the work of an anonymous developer known by the handle Forbin, who has described himself as an engineer employed in Silicon Valley. He began the project on March 7, 2010, and developed it part-time over the following months. According to the author, the initial aim was to let his son experience the atmosphere of 1980s computer intrusion without interfering with real systems.

The simulation is implemented in Perl and runs as a single process organised around an event loop based on epoll. Two language interpreters are embedded in it: one for Z-code, adapted from the Rezrov package distributed through CPAN, and a BASIC interpreter written by the author. Emulation of the 6502 and VAX architectures is handled within the same process rather than delegated to separate programs.

== Simulated network ==
The environment depicts the ARPANET and Usenet as they stood between roughly 1985 and 1990. TechRadar counted some 24,000 simulated machines in 2011. Later accounts give a figure of about 26,600. Each host carries period material, and the network as a whole holds files, executable programs, games and bulletin board systems.

That material was assembled from surviving records of the early network. Textual documents were drawn largely from the collection at textfiles.com; further programs came from the SIMTEL archive, while UUCP maps of the period supplied the names given to the simulation's dormant accounts. The newsgroup material originates in archives kept by Henry Spencer, described by Korben as roughly two million articles posted between 1981 and 1991 and preserved on 141 magnetic tapes.

Alongside reading matter, hosts carry interactive fiction and other early titles, among them Zork, Adventure and Rogue, an animated ASCII art rendering of Star Wars, and a library of programs for the built-in BASIC interpreter. Utilities modelled on period intrusion software are provided as in-world executables, including a wardialer and a port-scanning tool, and accounts are secured with deliberately weak passwords so that they can be opened by guessing. Progress is marked by a system of ranks awarded for the number of hosts a participant has compromised, and some hosts and programs are concealed, becoming reachable only once Telehack itself has been subverted. Participants share a single persistent world and can exchange messages through an in-world chat facility as well as read the archived newsgroups. Korben reported an audience of more than 50,000 users.

== Access ==
The simulation is reached either through a web browser or with a telnet client, and also accepts connections over SSH. Korben lists several telnet ports alongside a dedicated SSH port, and notes that the system additionally answers a dial-up line at 14.4 kbit/s, reproducing the way such services were reached at the time. Navigation relies on commands of the era: hosts are enumerated with netstat, connections opened with telnet or by dialling a number, and the users logged in to a given machine listed with finger.

== Reception ==
TechRadar described Telehack as a large shared environment where aspiring intruders could practise lawfully. Writing for Cybernews, Jesse William McGraw grouped it with simulations aimed at newcomers, valuing it for conveying the working culture of the period as well as command-line technique. Andy Baio characterised the project as playable archaeology, a reconstruction assembled from surviving traces of the early network rather than an invented setting. Coverage has continued well beyond its launch, with Korben revisiting the simulation in 2025.
