= XOVER =

XOVER is a Network News Transfer Protocol (NNTP) command used to return information from a news server's overview (NOV) database..

The XOVER command is documented in RFC 2980, a specification for Common NNTP Extensions authored by Stan O. Barber in October 2000. A newer version of NNTP, specified in RFC 3977, formalized the XOVER extension with new OVER and LIST OVERVIEW.FMT commands.

== See also ==
- List of Usenet newsreaders
- Usenet newsgroup
- News server
