= Open-News-Network e.V. =

German network providing Usenet access

Open News Network e.V. is a German group ("Eingetragener Verein"). It is a network both in the technological and in the social sense. It aims to provide open, non-commercial access to text-based Usenet. Membership is constituted by support of the project. Support may be in the form of active collaboration, allocation of resources, or both.

== History ==
- 21 Feb 2005 Posting in de.comm provider usenet Message-ID: <pan.2005.02.21.01.12.52.335900@familieknaak.de>
- 8 Mar 2005 Joern Bredereck announced the idea.
- 12 May 2007 society according to German law incorporated.

== Usenet ==
Open-News-Network e.V provides traditional Usenet groups."It is a Germany based cooperative network of Usenet enthusiasts who run their servers on otherwise unused resources."
