= Usenet Death Penalty =

Policy of blocking and deleting posts

On Usenet, the Usenet Death Penalty (UDP) is a final penalty that may be issued against Internet service providers or single users who produce too much spam or fail to adhere to Usenet standards. It is named after the death penalty (the state-sanctioned killing of a person as punishment for a crime), as it causes the banned user or provider to be unable to use Usenet, essentially "killing" their service. Messages that fall under the jurisdiction of a Usenet Death Penalty will be cancelled. Cancelled messages are deleted from Usenet servers and not allowed to propagate. This causes users on the affected ISP to be unable to post to Usenet, and it puts pressure on the ISP to change their policies. Notable cases include actions taken against UUNET, CompuServe, Excite@Home, and Google Groups.

== Types ==
There are three types of Usenet Death Penalty:

1. Active: with an active UDP, messages that fall under the UDP will be automatically cancelled by third parties or their agents, such as by using cancelbots.
2. Passive: with a passive UDP, messages that fall under the UDP will simply be ignored and will not spread.
3. Partial: a partial UDP applies only to a certain subset of newsgroups, not the entire Usenet newsgroup hierarchy.

To be effective, the UDP must be supported by a large number of servers, or the majority of the major transit servers. Otherwise, the articles will propagate throughout the smaller, slower peerings.

UDPs are not casual acts. They are announced beforehand, only after the owner of the offending server has been contacted and given several chances to correct the perceived problem. Since the effects on the users of a server under a UDP can be significant, if the users want to post, the impact of a UDP can induce the operators of an offending server to address problems quickly.

UDPs have been issued against America Online, BBN Planet, CompuServe, Erols Internet, Netcom, TIAC, and UUNET.

== History ==
The first UDP software was written by Karl Kleinpaste in 1990, though there is disagreement when the term itself was coined: the Net Abuse FAQ claims 1993, but a message posted on 18 August of that year claims that it was coined "years earlier" by Eliot Lear.

A UDP was implemented against UUNET on 1 August 1997 after it became a host for many spammers and was unresponsive to abuse complaints. It forced the provider to implement antispam policies and tools and close their open relays. Executives called the UDP "digital terrorism", threatened legal action, and asserted they had been planning to move against spammers anyway. As the volume of spam from UUNET decreased, the organizers called off the penalty on August 6, though their announcement was stifled by cancel messages from UDP opponents.

An active UDP was implemented against CompuServe on 18 November 1997, which was lifted the following day after the company implemented anti-spamming measures and instituted a new acceptable use policy addressing spamming.

A UDP scheduled to begin against Excite@Home on 19 January 2000 was lifted the day before it was scheduled to begin after the ISP began scanning for the misconfigured proxy servers on home users' computers which it blamed for spam originating from its network.

In October 2023, a UDP had been called upon Google Groups, with reasons citing persistent high-volume spam originated from the service and other operators' complaints about such spam that went unresolved. As a result, in December 2023, Google announced discontinuation of USENET service in Google Groups, which finally become effective on 15 February 2024.

== See also ==
- Shadow banning
- Kill file
- Damnatio memoriae
