= Jim Ellis (computing) =

American computer scientist (1956–2001)

James T. Ellis
- Born: James Tice Ellis; May 6, 1956; Nashville, Tennessee, U.S.
- Died: June 28, 2001 (aged 45); Harmony, Pennsylvania, U.S.
- Education: Duke University
- Spouse: Carolyn Ellis
- Children: 2
- Scientific career
- Fields: Computer science

James Tice Ellis (May 6, 1956 – June 28, 2001) was an American computer scientist best known as the co-creator of Usenet, along with Tom Truscott.

Ellis was born in Nashville, Tennessee to Henry Ellis (an auditor and teacher) and Elsa Ellis. James Ellis grew up in Orlando, Florida. Before developing Usenet, Ellis attended Duke University. After graduating, Ellis worked for the Microelectronics Center of North Carolina in Research Triangle Park, N.C. He later worked as an Internet security consultant for Sun Microsystems. He was also Manager of Technical Development at CERT. He invented the word Usenet.

Ellis and Truscott were awarded the 1995 USENIX Lifetime Achievement Award.

== Personal life and death ==
Ellis and his wife, Carolyn, had two children.

He died of non-Hodgkin lymphoma, a form of blood cancer, at his home in Harmony, Pennsylvania on June 28, 2001. He was 45.
