= Astraweb =

Usenet/newsgroup service provider

Astraweb, Inc.
- Type: Private
- Industry: Telecommunications
- Founded: 1997
- Products: Usenet
- Website: www.astraweb.com

Astraweb is a Usenet/newsgroup service provider. Founded in 1997, Astraweb service is available to individual users through a subscription model and as an outsourced service to Internet service providers. In addition, Astraweb offers 'block accounts' (pay-per-byte).

== Evolution of retention time ==
Notably, Astraweb was responsible for the huge increase of retention on almost all big Usenet services, which was triggered by their announcement to keep files for up to 270 days in December 2008. As of July 2013, retention time for files was up to 1800 days. and in July 2014, retention time for files was up to 2150 days. Later in 2014, retention time was increased to 2278 days. As of 2021 the retention time has increased to 4000 days.
