= A News =

A News, or Netnews Version A, originally known simply as news, was the first widely distributed program for serving and reading Usenet newsgroups. The program, written at Duke University by Steve Daniel and Tom Truscott, was released on a tape given out at the June 1980 USENIX conference held at the University of Delaware. Steve Daniel from Duke offered a presentation on the then-new Usenet network and invited attendees to join.

Seventh Edition Unix included a "message of the day" facility, which allowed the system operator to cause messages to be displayed to the user at login. A News (so called because each message began with "A" as a marker character) was an expansion of this facility that allowed news messages to be distributed across an arbitrary number of systems using the new uucp service.

In addition to the login display, news articles could be read at any time from the command line. A user could also post new messages to the local machine (by posting to a special default newsgroup called "general") or queue it for network-wide transmission by placing it in a public group such as "NET.general".

The software was designed primarily for announcements, so the interface was extremely simple. There were no provisions built in for replying to articles over news (e-mail replies were supported), skipping over messages, or threading. Because the system was designed only with uucp in mind, posters were identified by their uucp "bang path" addresses, a feature that persists (albeit more for identifying servers than users) in modern Usenet. ARPAnet addressing was not supported.

The message format was designed for compactness rather than flexibility, consistent with the slow dialup modems used in 1980. The initial "A" dictated the layout of header and message information, and expansions would require changing the initial character. This scheme was abandoned after A news for the more verbose but expandable format seen today.

Because Usenet grew rapidly, the limited capabilities and simplistic article storage scheme (all articles were placed in a single disk directory and there was no facility for expiring old articles) quickly made A News impractical to use. It was largely superseded by B News, although some organizations continued to use it for internal communications for many years. Later modifications did add the ability to process the early B News article format and act on B News control articles.

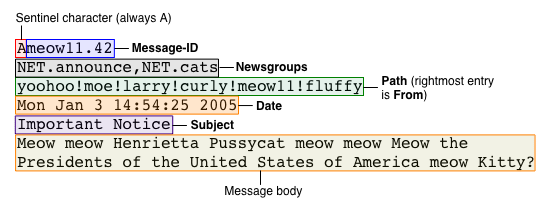
Example of an early Usenet article. The legends in bold type are the equivalent header names in a modern Usenet article.
