= CAUCE =

Anti-spam advocacy group (1997–)

The Coalition Against Unsolicited Commercial Email (CAUCE) is a non-profit advocacy group that works to reduce the amount of unsolicited commercial email, or spam, via legislation. CAUCE was founded in 1997 by participants in the Usenet newsgroup news.admin.net-abuse.email and the SPAM-L mailing list.

CAUCE North America was formed in March 2007 through the merger of CAUCE US and CAUCE Canada. As an all-volunteer consumer advocacy organization, it expanded its focus from promoting anti-spam legislation to addressing a broader range of issues affecting Internet users.

Other CAUCE chapters were formed in Canada, Europe (where they were among the first to lobby for effective antispam legislation) and Australia. CAUCE India was formed in the late 1990s.

In 2003, APCAUCE (CAUCE Asia Pacific) was formed to bring together CAUCE chapters in the Asia Pacific region, and hosts technical workshops and policy roundtable "regional update" sessions at regional network operator conferences such as SANOG and APRICOT.

It is also a member of the Anti-Spyware Coalition.

== See also ==
- Neil Schwartzman, a co-founder of CAUCE Canada
