= Net.wars =

1997 book by Wendy M. Grossman

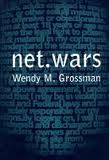
- Book cover
- Author: Wendy M. Grossman
- Language: English
- Subject: Internet
- Genre: Non-fiction
- Publisher: NYU Press
- Publication date: 1997
- Publication place: United States
- Media type: Hardback
- Pages: 256
- ISBN: 0-8147-3103-1
- Followed by: From Anarchy to Power The Net Comes of Age

Net.wars is a non-fiction book by journalist Wendy M. Grossman about conflict and controversy among stakeholders on the Internet. It was published by NYU Press in 1997, and was simultaneously made available free as an online version. The book discusses conflicts which arose during the growth of the Internet from 1993 through 1997, labeled by Grossman as "boundary disputes". These disputes deal with issues including privacy, encryption, copyright, censorship, sex, and pornography. The author discusses history of organizations in their attempts to enforce their intellectual property on the Internet, against individuals who attempted to reveal confidential materials asserting it was in the public interest. Grossman frames these disputes with respect to overarching rights of freedom of speech and the First Amendment to the United States Constitution.

The book received a positive reception, and was described by Technology Review as "one of the first comprehensive reports on the upheavals underway in cyberspace." Publishers Weekly praised the depth of discussion in the book, and Library Journal commented positively on the history and background imparted. New Scientist gave the book a favorable review, commenting, "Here at last is a sensible, thought-provoking and informative book about the complexity and challenges of the Net." Reason magazine observed, "Grossman has written an intriguing account of the Internet's partial fulfillment of its seemingly limitless promise."

== Publication history ==
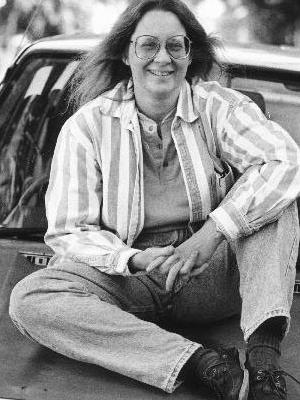
Wendy M. Grossman (1997)

Prior to the book's publication, the author was recognized in 1996 with an award from the American Society of Journalists and Authors for an article in Wired magazine about conflict on the Internet. Net.wars was published in book format by NYU Press in 1997, in addition to an edition in a computer file format. NYU Press made the text of the book available for free via its website.

== Contents ==
The book discusses the changes online citizens saw take place on the Internet during the period in the intervening years between 1993 and 1997. Grossman labels the conflict which took place during this time as "boundary disputes". These "boundary disputes" included issues involving privacy, encryption, copyright, censorship, sex, and pornography. She describes these conflicts as taking place, "along the border between cyberspace and real life". Grossman attributes this conflict to "the Net's convulsions over the years 1993 to 1996, as it tried to assimilate huge numbers of new users who didn't share the culture that had been developing over the previous decade". The author acknowledges that she is a "Netizen", and questions her own objective stance due to this involvement.

Grossman informs the reader that she appreciates "the fact that in this age of polite political correctness there is a place in the world where people feel free to speak their minds, even offensively". She gives an analogy for the reader regarding those who would discuss and comment on the phenomenon of the Internet-based community without prior experience: "Journalists who don't use the Net themselves routinely make such egregious technological and cultural errors that you can only compare the results to what would happen if they were assigned to write about the interstate highway system based on their experiences at sea.... [I]f the police told you that prostitutes routinely and openly solicited truckers and other visitors to roadside rest areas and that therefore they were risky places for families to visit, you would probably believe them and write the story.... At the same time, after a while it's easy to lose perspective and forget that behavior which is common and tolerated on the Net seems shocking to newcomers."

The author states her desire for the Internet to remain an open community, "I would like to see the freedom of the old net.culture survive in the face of the many competing commercial and regulatory interests that might prefer to limit its reach and openness." The book delves into specific examples of organizations which attempted to enforce their perceived intellectual property from being distributed to websites on the Internet, as balanced against the ability of people participating in an online community to bring previously confidential material to light whilst stating it serves the public interest to do so. She recounts activism by Internet users against the Communications Decency Act, which was ultimately deemed unconstitutional by the Supreme Court of the United States. Grossman includes a discussion of participation in online discussion on the Internet with respect to the rights of freedom of speech and the First Amendment to the United States Constitution.

== Reception ==
Writing for the Technology Review of the Massachusetts Institute of Technology, Wade Roush called the book, "one of the first comprehensive reports on the upheavals underway in cyberspace." Roush commented on the author's writing style, "Grossman writes plainly yet entertainingly, providing a pleasant antidote to the breathless rhetoric one finds in many books and magazines devoted to computer culture." The review concluded, "But what ties the book together is Grossman's demonstration that the boundary disputes have more to do with power than with decency or etiquette. The Net gives all its users a vastly increased power to communicate. How much of this power, she asks, will average users be allowed to keep?"

Donna Seaman of Booklist wrote that Grossman, "vividly describes the virtual realm as a place of interconnecting communities every bit as complicated, exciting, and dangerous as any city." Seaman concluded, "As Grossman relates Net lore and history, she traces its transformation from a textual, academic medium into a graphics-heavy promotional bonanza, a development that has caused the online population to double over the past three years to nearly 60 million users." In a review for Choice: Current Reviews for Academic Libraries, C. Koch characterized the work, "This book is in the form of a series of explorations of various instances of such problems and how they can be seen to relate to matters of undesirable curtailment of free speech and to the more positive potential of the Net to foster new Net communities." Koch wrote of the author's writing style, "The book is a bit rambling in style, but those committed to the value of open Net community may find it pleasantly reflective."

Publishers Weekly reviewed the book and recommended it for multiple types of readers, "Both newbies (newcomers to the Internet) and Netizens (old-timers) will find challenges and rewards in this witty, knowledgeable and timely report from the electronic front." Publishers Weekly wrote positively of the amount of detail included in the book's discussion, "Journalist Grossman covers in considerable depth the battles now raging over the First Amendment rights, security, privacy and general standards of conduct in cyberspace." Library Journal wrote of the success of the author's argumentation, "Grossman sets out to answer questions about the future of the Internet and how it will be regulated. She does a fine job of explaining the issues and the background behind online controversies". Library Journal commented on Grossman's viewpoint, "Her approach is one of informed skepticism".

"Here at last is a sensible, thought-provoking and informative book about the complexity and challenges of the Net. "

— New Scientist

Harold Thimbleby of New Scientist gave the book a positive review, writing, "Here at last is a sensible, thought-provoking and informative book about the complexity and challenges of the Net." He compared Grossman's writing to other works on the subject matter, "Most books are too enthusiastic about the technology, too American, too Utopian, too get-rich-quick—or just out of date. In Net.wars we have a good, profoundly challenging book, which rises above parochialism. It is full of insights—as much into bulletin boards as sexual stereotyping, rights to free speech and establishing global copyright." Thimbleby concluded, "Everyone, particularly police, lawyers, teachers, parents and scientists, can usefully read this book and consider what the Net really means for us all."

In a review for Reason, Nick Gillespie described the book as, "a nuanced map to the latest 'place' to inspire grand utopian thinking: the Internet, that ethereal and increasingly important worldwide network of computer networks." Gillespie wrote positively of the author's breadth of knowledge and experience about the subject matter, "An American journalist living in London, Grossman brings a wealth of professional and personal experience to the material—and a clarity of style and analysis that is a welcome relief from both the hyperbolic prose of many Net boosters and the overwrought jeremiads of cyberphobes." His review concluded, "the great virtue of net.wars is its recognition that cyberspace's utopian potential—its ability to enrich existing real communities while creating new, virtual ones—is directly tied to its ability to change, grow, and make itself useful to its inhabitants. In showing how that process works in both historical and cultural terms, Grossman has written an intriguing account of the Internet's partial fulfillment of its seemingly limitless promise."

The Village Voice pointed out the decision of publisher NYU Press to publish the book's contents online, noting, "Risking profits for the sake of progress, NYU Press has decided to publish journalist Wendy Grossman's canny new book, net.wars, simultaneously in print and in a free online version ... For NYU, it's a big gamble for publicity." The review observed that the nature of the book's format was appropriate for online distribution, "the online design of net.wars points to an even more dramatic literary evolution. Net.wars, with over 500 hypertext links, is truly more Web site than book, and it unquestionably belongs online." In its review of her book, Kirkus Reviews pointed out a paradox regarding one of Grossman's proposed solutions to issues of encroachment upon Internet freedoms. Kirkus Reviews noted, "Unfortunately, the solutions that Grossman suggests, while more politically moderate than those suggested by others, seem to subvert the true purpose of the Internet. She suggests smaller, more manageable virtual communities, whereas the Internet, in theory, is supposed to link all corners of the world." The review concluded, "At least Grossman is offering solutions, however, which is what distinguishes net.wars from most contribution on this seemingly inexhaustible topic."

== See also ==
- Censorship – Suppression of speech and information
- Censorship in the United States
- Free content – Free licensed works in any field
- Freedom of speech by country
- Freedom of speech in the United States
- Freedom of the press – Freedom of communication and expression through various media
- International Freedom of Expression Exchange – International non-governmental organization
- WikiLeaks – News leak publishing organisation
