= C News =

Internet news server

C News is a news server package, written by Geoff Collyer, assisted by Henry Spencer, at the University of Toronto as a replacement for B News. It was presented at the Winter 1987 USENIX conference in Washington, D.C.

Functionally, the operation of C News is very much like that of B News. One major difference was that C News was written with portability in mind. It ran on many variants of Unix and even MS-DOS. The relaynews program that handled article filing and feeding was carefully optimized and designed to process articles in batches, while B News processed one article per program invocation. The authors claimed that relaynews could process articles 19 times as quickly as B News.

In 1992, Collyer gave C News a new index facility called NOV (or News Overview). This allowed newsreaders to rapidly retrieve header and threading information with relatively little load on the server. Virtually all current news servers continue to use this method in the form of the NNTP XOVER command. Development of C News stopped about 1995, and the package was largely superseded by INN.
