= Giganews =

Usenet/newsgroup service provider

Giganews, Inc.
- Company type: Private
- Industry: Telecommunications
- Founded: 1994 in Austin, Texas
- Headquarters: Austin, Texas
- Products: Usenet
- Website: giganews.com

Giganews, Inc is a Usenet/newsgroup service provider. Founded in 1994, Giganews service is available to individual users through a subscription model and as an outsourced service to internet service providers. Well-known ISPs that have outsourced Usenet access to Giganews include RCN Corporation, BT, WOW! (Wide Open West), and Kingston Communications.

In 2008 Giganews acquired Supernews.

In 2010, Giganews began offering users VPN and cloud storage access ("VyprVPN" and "Dump Truck", respectively) via its parent company, Golden Frog.

Giganews currently offers service to over 10 million broadband users in 180 countries.

Giganews traffic is peered at Equinix in Ashburn in Loudoun County, Virginia, AMS-IX and NL-IX in The Netherlands, DE-CIX in Frankfurt, Germany, and LINX in London, United Kingdom. In late 2008, Giganews' bandwidth capacity at AMS-IX increased from 40 Gbit/s to 80 Gbit/s.

Giganews offers more than three years of article retention in binary groups and eight years in text groups. This results in more than nine petabytes (9000 terabytes) of storage.
