= Wendy M. Grossman =

American journalist (born 1954)

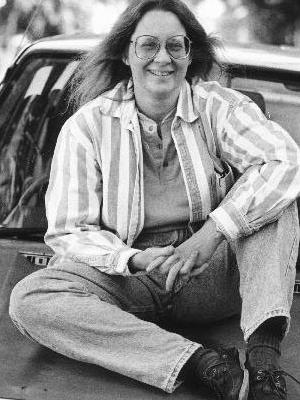
Wendy M. Grossman
- Born: January 26, 1954 (age 72); New York City, U.S.
- Education: Cornell University
- Occupations: Journalist; Blogger; folksinger; Author (non-fiction)
- Writing career
- Genre: Technology
- Notable works: Remembering the Future: Interviews from Personal Computer World; Net.wars; She founded the magazine The Skeptic in the United Kingdom
- Notable awards: In 2013, Grossman was the winner of the Enigma Award.
- Website: pelicancrossing.net

Wendy M. Grossman (born January 26, 1954) is a journalist, blogger, and folksinger. Her writing has been published in several newspapers, magazines, and specialized publications. She is the recipient of the 2013 Enigma Award for information security reporting.

== Education ==
Grossman was born in New York City. She graduated from Cornell University in 1975.

== Career ==
=== Writer and editor ===
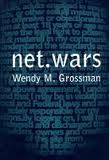
Front cover of Net.wars by Wendy M. Grossman

In 1987, she founded the magazine The Skeptic in the United Kingdom, which she edited for some time. As founder and editor, she has appeared on numerous UK TV and radio programmes. Her credits since 1990 include work for Scientific American, The Guardian, and the Daily Telegraph, as well as New Scientist, Wired and Wired News, and The Inquirer for which she wrote a regular weekly net.wars column. That column continues in NewsWireless and on her own site every Friday. She was a columnist for Internet Today from July 1996 until it closed in April 1997, and together with Dominic Young ran the Fleet Street Forum on CompuServe UK in the mid-1990s.

She edited an anthology of interviews with leading computer industry figures taken from the pages of the British computer magazine Personal Computer World. Entitled Remembering the Future, it was published in January 1997 by Springer Verlag. Her 1998 book net.wars was one of the first to have its full text published on the Web. She was a member of an external board that advised Edinburgh University on the creation of the Intellectual Property and Law Centre.

She sits on the executive committee of the Association of British Science Writers and the Advisory Councils of the Open Rights Group and Privacy International.

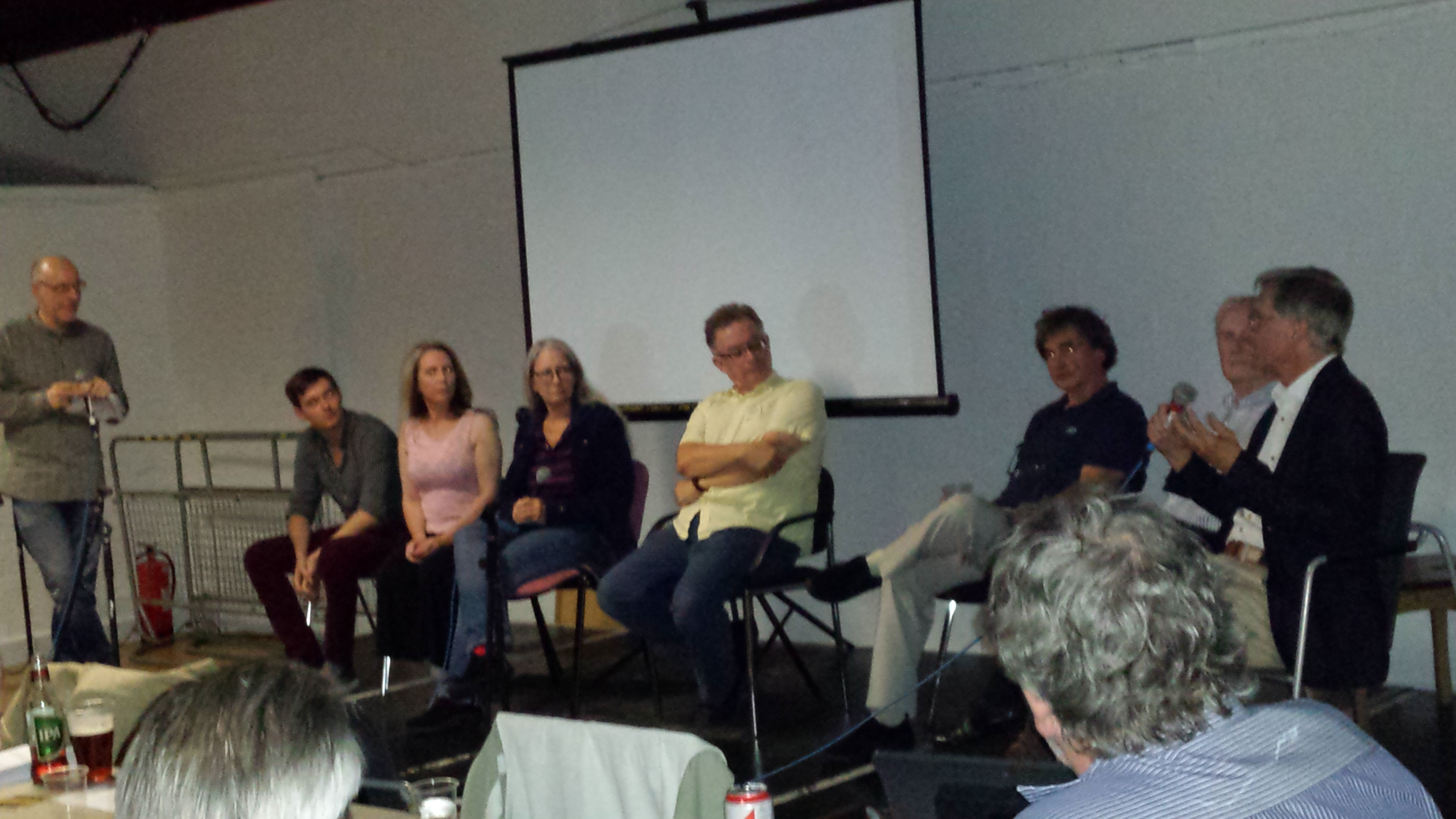
Greenwich Skeptics in the Pub, 10 September 2015. Title: 'The Growth of Skepticism: The UK Experience'. Featuring leading UK skeptics Richard Wiseman, Michael Marshall, Deborah Hyde, Wendy Grossman, Chris French, Mike Heap, Mike Hutchinson and Ian Ridpath. The event was part of the European Skeptics Congress 2015.

In February 2011 Grossman was elected as a Fellow of the Committee for Skeptical Inquiry.

She is Contributing Editor and Co-Host at the Plutopia News Network.

=== Folk singer ===
Grossman was a full-time folk singer from 1975 to 1983 and her folk album Roseville Fair was released in 1980. She also played on Archie Fisher's 1976 LP The Man With a Rhyme.

She was president of the Cornell Folk Song Club, the oldest university-affiliated, student-run folk song club in the US, from 1973 to 1975.

In 2024, Grossman released a 13-track album The Last Trip Home through Riverlark Music. Described as "a mixed-up baker's dozen", it includes instrumentals plus ballads traditional and contemporary.

== TV appearances ==
In 2005, Grossman featured on an episode of the BBC Three comedy spoof series High Spirits with Shirley Ghostman.

== Awards ==
In 2013, Grossman was the winner of the Enigma Award, part of the BT Information Security Journalism Awards, "for her dedication and outstanding contribution to information security journalism, recognising her extensive writing on the subject for several publications over a number of years".

== Works ==
- Remembering the Future: Interviews from Personal Computer World (1996)
- Net.wars (1998)
- From Anarchy to Power: The Net Comes of Age (2001)
- The Daily Telegraph A–Z Guide to the Internet (2001)
- The Daily Telegraph Small Business Guide to Computer Networking (2003)
- Why Statues Weep: The Best of the "Skeptic" (2010) – with Chris French
