= Textfiles.com =

Archive of digital media

The front page of textfiles.com in 2004

textfiles.com is a website dedicated to preserving the digital documents that contain the history of the bulletin board system (BBS) world and various subcultures, and thus providing "a glimpse into the history of writers and artists bound by the 128 characters that the American Standard Code for Information Interchange (ASCII) allowed them". The site categorizes and stores thousands of text files, primarily from the 1980s, but also contains some older files and some that were created well into the 1990s. A broad range of topics is presented, including anarchy, art, carding, computers, drugs, ezines, freemasonry, computer games, hacking, phreaking, politics, computer piracy, sex, and UFOs. The site was created and is run by Jason Scott.

The site went online in 1998, and as of 2005 had collected 58,227 files. As of 2017 the site was averaging 350,000–450,000 unique visitors per month. Most of the textfiles.com projects are "completionist" in outlook, attempting to gather as much information as possible within the decided scope.

The site also houses a number of sub-projects with their own hostnames. artscene.textfiles.com has a repository of computer art including crack intros, ANSI and ASCII art and other related documents; audio.textfiles.com has an archive of audio files, including prank calls, recorded telephone conferences with BBS owners and hacker radio shows; cd.textfiles.com contains an archive of 1990s shareware discs; web.textfiles.com contains files created after the World Wide Web went into mainstream use, approximately 1995; bbslist.textfiles.com aims to be a comprehensive list of all historical BBSes; timeline.textfiles.com is meant to list all important events in the history of BBSes.

== See also ==
- Archive Team
- Internet Archive
- Jason Scott
- Telehack
