= UUNET =

U.S. Internet service provider

UUNET Technologies, Inc.
- UUNET Technologies Logo
- Trade name: Verizon Enterprise Solutions; Verizon Business
- Formerly: UUNET Communications Services (1987–1989)
- Type: Subsidiary
- Industry: Telecommunications
- Founded: 1987; 39 years ago
- Defunct: 2006; 20 years ago
- Fate: Acquired by Verizon Communications in 2006
- Headquarters: Ashburn, Virginia, U.S.
- Products: Conferencing, Contact Centers, Data and IP Services, Internet access, IT Solutions and Hosting, Managed Networks, Premises Equipment (CPE), Security, Voice, VoIP, Wireless
- Parent: Verizon Communications (2006–present)
- Website: uu.net at the Wayback Machine (archived 2001-11-01)

UUNET Technologies, Inc., formerly UUNET Communications Services, was an American commercial Internet service provider. Founded in 1987, it was one of the first and largest commercial ISPs and one of the early Tier 1 networks. It was based in Northern Virginia. Today, UUNET is an internal brand of Verizon Business (formerly MCI).

== History ==
=== Background ===
Prior to its founding, access to Usenet and e-mail exchange from non-ARPANET sites was accomplished using a cooperative network of systems running the UUCP protocol over POTS lines. During the mid-1980s, growth of this network began to put considerable strain on the resources voluntarily provided by the larger UUCP hubs. This prompted Rick Adams, a system administrator at the Center for Seismic Studies, to explore the possibilities of providing these services commercially as a way to reduce the burden on the existing hubs.

=== Early existence ===
With funding in the form of a loan from Usenix, UUNET Communications Services began operations in 1987 as a non-profit corporation providing Usenet feeds, e-mail exchange, and access to a large repository of software source code and related information. The venture proved successful and shed its non-profit status within two years. At the same time, the company changed its name to UUNET Technologies. In 1990, UUNET launched its AlterNet service, which provided access to an IP backbone independent of the constraints of those operated by the government. That network lives on in a much larger form and serves as the core of a set of products that include access at dial-up and broadband speeds as well as web hosting. UUNET raised $6 Million from Accel Partners, Menlo Ventures, and New Enterprise Associates in 1993 and $8.2 million in 1996 for expanding its network and hiring new executives with experience in marketing.

In the mid-1990s, UUNET was the fastest-growing ISP, outpacing MCI and Sprint. At its peak, Internet traffic was briefly doubling every few months, which translates to 10x growth each year. However, the continuing UUNET claims of such growth (long after it had fallen to lower, albeit still substantial levels) artificially fueled the expectations of the dot-com and telecom companies of the late 1990s, leading to the dot-com bubble and crash in 2000/2001.

=== Mergers and acquisitions ===
UUNET was acquired by MFS on 30 April 1996. This was an independent acquisition unrelated to the acquisition of MFS by WorldCom. However, as MFS was a public company and the acquisition made the company a Wall Street darling, it likely influenced WorldCom's decision to pursue MFS.

UUNET was acquired by WorldCom on 26 August 1996, as part of WorldCom's purchase of MFS Communications Company.

In 2001, UUNET was fully integrated with WorldCom and the name was dropped from all official documents.

In 2002, the owner of UUNET at that time (WorldCom) filed for what was then the largest Chapter 11 bankruptcy protection in history.

In 2005, its Internet service and infrastructure, assigned AS701, maintained the highest outdegree of any ISP.

=== Verizon ===
In 2006, WorldCom was purchased by Verizon Communications and now operates under the Verizon Business name.

== Spam ==
After it had been sold and resold during the onset of the dot-com bubble, UUNET acquired the nickname SpewSpewNET. This nickname was given because UUNET had become a home for many distributors of spam, including distributors of both Newsgroup spam and E-mail spam. UUNET also became known for providing bulletproof hosting to many web pages whose chief form of advertisement was spam. Because UUNET started with a loan from Usenix and controlled the e-mail addresses for moderated Usenet groups, it was hard to block email traffic to or from UUNET. In 1997, UUNET had lost so much credit that on 1 August, after finding alternate routes for moderated newsgroups, a Usenet death penalty (UDP) was issued against UUNET. A week later, the UDP was lifted. In 1998 UUNET threatened legal action for hosting a GIF image with "SPAMUNET" on it.

== Timeline ==
- 1987 – UUNET Communications Services is founded and passes its first traffic via the CompuServe Network on 12 May using UUCP (Unix to Unix Copy Protocol).
- 1989 – UUNET becomes a for-profit corporation.
- 1990 – UUNET launches AlterNet.
- 1991 – UUNET participates in the founding of the Commercial Internet Exchange Association.
- 1992 - UUNET with MFS co-creates MAE-East, for a time the world's busiest Internet exchange and "center of the internet".
- 1994 – Microsoft paid $16.4 million for a 15 percent share of the company.
- 1995 – In May, UUNET is listed on the NASDAQ stock market in an initial public offering that would become part of the beginning of the dot-com boom.
- 1995 – UUNET Technologies Inc places a takeover bid against Unipalm Pipex.
- 1996 – UUNET Technologies agreed to a merger with MFS Communications Company.
- 1996 – Metropolitan Fiber Systems (MFS) acquires UUNET for $2 Billion on 12 August 1996. This marked the day UUNET stopped existing as an independent company.
- 1996 – WorldCom acquires MFS on New Year's Eve – 31 Dec. at 11:58 p.m EST for $12.4 billion.
- 1997 – Usenet death penalty (UDP) issued against UUNET, and lifted a week later.
- 1997 – On 10 November, WorldCom and MCI announced their US$37 billion merger including combining internetMCI & UUNET Internet operations.
- 1998 – The combined MCI WorldCom opens for business on 15 September after being given the go-ahead from the DOJ, subsequent to divesting internet MCI.
- 1998 – WorldCom acquires CompuServe Network Services from H&R Block and ANS Communications from AOL. Both become part of UUNET in 1999.
- 1999 – On 5 October, MCI Worldcom announces its intentions to buy Sprint for $129 billion.
- 2000 – The European Commission and DOJ denied the MCI WorldCom / Sprint merger on Antitrust Grounds.
- 2001 – The UUNET brand is folded into WorldCom's product line and disappears.
- 2002 – WorldCom files for Chapter 11 bankruptcy protection as a result of a massive $11 billion accounting scandal.
- 2003 – The UUNET brand re-emerges as WorldCom's wholesale-only brand.
- 2004 – WorldCom emerges from Chapter 11 bankruptcy and renames itself to MCI, still using the UUNET brand for wholesale business.
- 2005 – MCI again drops the UUNET brand for wholesale business. The name is no longer in use.
- 2006 – Verizon acquires MCI, including its UUNET subsidiary, now known as Verizon Business. AS701 remains the backbone of Verizon Business although its origin dates back to 1990 when it was under the UUNET flag.

== See also ==
- List of companies headquartered in Northern Virginia
- Timeline of the history of the Internet
