= Tom Truscott =

American computer scientist (born 1956)

- Born: Tom Truscott
- Education: Duke University
- Scientific career
- Fields: Computer science

Tom Truscott is an American computer scientist known best for creating Usenet with Jim Ellis, when both were graduate students at Duke University. He is also a member of ACM, IEEE, and Sigma Xi. One of his first endeavors concerning computers was writing a computer chess program and then later working on a global optimizer for C at Bell Labs. This computer chess program competed in multiple computer chess tournaments such as the Toronto chess tournament in 1977 (second place) and the Linz tournament in 1980 (3rd place). Presently, Truscott works on applications that analyze software as a software developer for a company named SAS Institute.

Truscott received the USENIX Lifetime Achievement Award for Usenet.
