= Neil Schwartzman =

Canadian anti-spam activist

Neil Schwartzman is a Canadian anti-spam activist who has been involved in anti-spam efforts since 1995. He was a co-founder and is executive director of CAUCE, and has sat on the Canadian Federal Task Force on Spam and the U.S. Federal Communications Commission's CSRIC Network Abuse Protection working group. He is currently the chair of the M3AAWG Awards Committee.

Neil graduated from Vanier College in Montreal as well as from Concordia University.
