= NorthPoint Communications =

Communications company

NorthPoint Communications Group, Inc.
- Founded: 1997; 29 years ago
- Founder: Michael W. Malaga
- Defunct: 2001; 25 years ago
- Fate: Bankruptcy, assets acquired by AT&T
- Headquarters: California
- Key people: Herman Bluestein (Chief Development Officer)
- Number of employees: 506 (1999)
- Website: northpoint.net at the Wayback Machine (archived 2000-06-19)

NorthPoint Communications Group, Inc. was a competitive local exchange carrier focused on data transmission via digital subscriber lines. The company had relationships with Microsoft, Tandy Corporation, Intel, Verio, Cable & Wireless, Frontier Corporation, Concentric Network, ICG Communications, Enron, Network Plus, and Netopia. The company had investments from The Carlyle Group, Accel Partners, Benchmark, and Greylock Partners.

== History ==
The company was founded in 1997 by Michael W. Malaga and 5 other former executives of Metropolitan Fiber Systems.

On May 5, 1999, during the dot-com bubble, the company became a public company via an initial public offering in which it sold 15 million shares at $24 per share, trading under the symbol NPNT on Nasdaq. Malaga, then 34 years old, was worth $300 million on paper.

In September 2000, Verizon agreed to acquire a 55% interest in the company and merge the companies' DSL businesses.

In November 2000, as its customers failed to pay their bills, NorthPoint restated downwards its financial performance for the third quarter of 2000, lowering revenue from $30 million to $24 million. After the earnings restatement, Verizon terminated its acquisition agreement, claiming that a material adverse change had occurred. Northpoint sued Verizon to force it to complete the transaction. The lawsuit was settled out of court in July 2002, with Verizon agreeing to pay $175 million to Northpoint. NorthPoint stated that "it would cut its workforce by 19%, or 248 jobs, to lower expenses after the collapse of its merger with Verizon."

=== Bankruptcy ===
In January 2001, NorthPoint filed for bankruptcy. Some internet service providers, which faced a disruption in service, blamed the banks for failing to work out a deal to save the company. In March 2001, AT&T Corporation acquired the assets of NorthPoint for $135 million in a liquidation.
