= Metropolitan Fiber Systems =

Defunct Nebraska-based U.S. telecom company

MFS Communications Company, Inc.
- Industry: Telecommunications
- Founded: 1988; 38 years ago
- Defunct: December 31, 1996; 29 years ago
- Fate: Acquired by Worldcom
- Headquarters: Omaha, Nebraska
- Revenue: $506 million (Q1 1997)
- Net income: $82 million (Q1 1997)
- Total assets: $12.335 billion (1997)
- Total equity: $10.190 billion (1997)

MFS Communications Company, Inc. (Metropolitan Fiber Systems) was a competitive local exchange carrier that owned and operated local network access facilities installed in and around major U.S. cities and several major European cities. MFS also possessed significant transmission and switching facilities and network capacity that it leased from other carriers in the United States and Western Europe.

== History ==
The company was founded in 1988 as Kiewit Communications, a subsidiary of Kiewit Corporation.

By 1991, the company owned fiber-optic lines that served large business customers in 11 cities.

In 1993, the company became a public company via an initial public offering.

In April 1996, the company announced the acquisition of UUNET.

In August 1996, WorldCom announced the acquisition of the company and the transaction was completed in December 1996. Worldcom filed bankruptcy in 2002.

Level 3 Communications and NorthPoint Communications were founded by former executives of MFS.
