= Supernews (Usenet provider) =

Usenet service provider

Supernews, Inc
- Company type: Private
- Industry: Telecommunications
- Founded: 1995
- Products: Usenet
- Owner: Giganews
- Website: www.supernews.com

Supernews is a Usenet service provider founded in 1995. It is currently owned by Giganews and currently share the same backbone. Offering consumers and Internet service providers direct access to Usenet, Supernews is one of the oldest Usenet providers today.

Its website is available in English, French, German, and Dutch.

== Service ==
Supernews offers individual users one plan for its Usenet newsgroups service:

- Unlimited GB Usenet
- Unlimited Speed — 1000 Mbit/s and faster
- Servers in North America and Europe
- 256-Bit SSL Encryption
- 2273 days of Binary Retention & 4153 days of Text Retention (as of November 5, 2014 with daily increases)
- 30 Connections
- 24-Hour Customer Support
- Payment methods: Visa, PayPal, MasterCard, Discover, American Express and iDEAL

== Retention Updates ==
- March 18, 2010 – to 400 days
- August 19, 2010 – to 500 days
- January 12, 2011 – to 800 days
- July 8, 2011 – to 1,058 days with daily incrementation following.
- December 15, 2011 – continuing with the daily incrementation since July 8, 2011 the retention was upgraded to 1,217 days.
- September 5, 2013 – as of this date binary retention is 1,847 days, while text retention is 3,727.
- February 29, 2016 - 2357 Days Binary Retention 4634 Days Text Retention

== History ==
- 1995: Supernews was founded in 1995 by Remarq Communities.
- 1998: Supernews changed its name to RemarQ Communities in 1998.
- 2000: Remarq was acquired by Critical Path and changed its name back to Supernews.
- 2007: SuperNews expands its network and opens a European Data Center in Amsterdam, connecting to the Amsterdam Internet Exchange (AMS-IX).
- 2010: Supernews accepts Euro payments via iDEAL
