= Junkyard tornado =

Fallacious argument against abiogenesis of chance

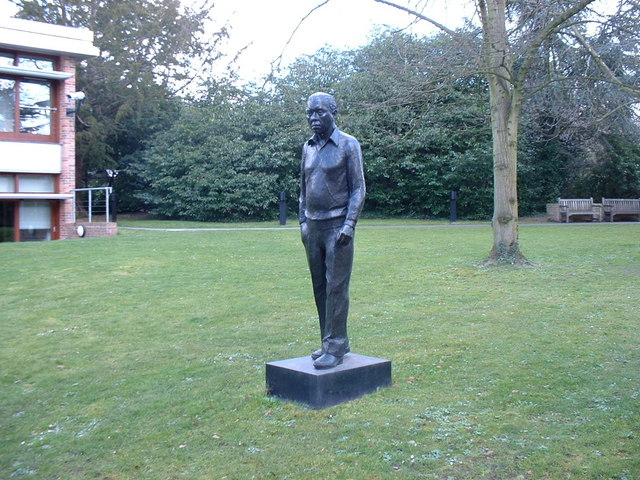
A statue of Sir Fred Hoyle, the formulator of the junkyard tornado argument

The junkyard tornado, sometimes known as Hoyle's fallacy, is a fallacious argument formulated by Fred Hoyle against Earth-based abiogenesis and in favor of panspermia. The junkyard tornado argument has been taken out of its original context by theists to argue for intelligent design, and has since become a mainstay in the rejection of evolution by religious groups, even though Fred Hoyle declared himself an atheist, and even though the junkyard tornado argument is considered a fallacy in its original context of Earth-based abiogenesis vs. panspermia.

The junkyard tornado argument uses a calculation of the probability of abiogenesis based on false assumptions, as comparable to "a tornado sweeping through a junk-yard might assemble a Boeing 747 from the materials therein" and to compare the chance of obtaining even a single functioning protein by chance combination of amino acids to a solar system full of blind men solving Rubik's Cubes simultaneously. It was used originally by English astronomer Fred Hoyle (1915–2001) in his book The Intelligent Universe, where he tried to apply statistics to evolution and the origin of life. Similar reasoning was advanced in Darwin's time, and indeed as long ago as Cicero in classical antiquity.

Hoyle's fallacy contradicts many well-established and widely tested principles in the field of evolutionary biology. As the fallacy argues, the odds of the sudden construction of higher lifeforms are indeed improbable. However, what the junkyard tornado postulation fails to take into account is the vast amount of support that evolution proceeds in many smaller stages, each driven by natural selection rather than by random chance, over a long period of time. The Boeing 747 was not designed in a single unlikely burst of creativity, just as modern lifeforms were not constructed in one single unlikely event, as the junkyard tornado scenario suggests.

This theory of evolution has been studied and tested extensively by numerous researchers and scientists and is the most scientifically accurate explanation for the origins of complex life.

== Hoyle's statement ==
According to Fred Hoyle's analysis, the probability of obtaining all of life's approximate 2000 enzymes in a random trial is about one-in-10^{40,000}:

Life cannot have had a random beginning … The trouble is that there are about two thousand enzymes, and the chance of obtaining them all in a random trial is only one part in 10^{40,000}, an outrageously small probability that could not be faced even if the whole universe consisted of organic soup.

His junkyard analogy:

The chance that higher life forms might have emerged in this way is comparable to the chance that a tornado sweeping through a junkyard might assemble a Boeing 747 from the materials therein.

This echoes his stance, reported elsewhere:

Life as we know it is, among other things, dependent on at least 2000 different enzymes. How could the blind forces of the primal sea manage to put together the correct chemical elements to build enzymes?

Hoyle used this to argue in favor of panspermia, that the origin of life on Earth was from preexisting life in space.

== History and reception ==
The junkyard tornado derives from arguments most popular in the 1920s, prior to the modern evolutionary synthesis, which are rejected by evolutionary biologists. A preliminary step is to establish that the phase space containing some biological entity (such as humans, working cells, or the eye) is enormous, something not contentious. The argument is then to infer from the huge size of the phase space that the probability that the entity could appear by chance is exceedingly low, ignoring the key process involved, natural selection.

Sometimes, arguments invoking the junkyard tornado analogy also invoke the universal probability bound, which claims that highly improbable events do not occur. It is refuted by the fact that if all possible outcomes of a natural process are highly improbable when taken individually, then one of the highly improbable outcomes is certain. The true law being referenced is actually the Strong Law of large numbers, but creationists have taken a simple statement made by Borel in books written late in his life concerning probability theory and called this statement Borel's Law.

The calculation of the probability ignores natural selection and falsely assumes that there is discrete uniform distribution. The junkyard tornado is also applied to cellular biochemistry. This is comparable to the older infinite monkey theorem but instead of the works of William Shakespeare, the claim is that the probability that a protein molecule could achieve a functional sequence of amino acids is too low to be realised by chance alone. The argument conflates the difference between the complexity that arises from living organisms that are able to reproduce themselves (and as such may evolve under natural selection to become better adapted and perhaps more complex over time) with the complexity of inanimate objects, unable to pass on any reproductive changes (such as the multitude of manufactured parts in a Boeing 747). The comparison breaks down because of this important distinction.

According to Ian Musgrave in Lies, Damned Lies, Statistics, and Probability of Abiogenesis Calculations:

These people, including Fred, have committed one or more of the following errors.

1. They calculate the probability of the formation of a "modern" protein, or even a complete bacterium with all "modern" proteins, by random events. This is not the abiogenesis theory at all.
2. They assume that there is a fixed number of proteins, with fixed sequences for each protein, that are required for life.
3. They calculate the probability of sequential trials, rather than simultaneous trials.
4. They misunderstand what is meant by a probability calculation.
5. They underestimate the number of functional enzymes/ribozymes present in a group of random sequences.

The junkyard tornado argument is rejected by evolutionary biologists as based on false assumptions, since "no biologist imagines that complex structures arise in a single step", as John Maynard Smith put it. Evolutionary biology explains how complex cellular structures evolved by analysing the intermediate steps required for precellular life. It is these intermediate steps that are omitted in creationist arguments, which is the cause of their overestimating of the improbability of the entire process.

Hoyle's argument is a mainstay of pseudosciences like creation science and intelligent design. Richard Dawkins described it as a fallacy in his book The God Delusion, arguing that the existence of God, who under theistic uses of Hoyle's argument is implicitly responsible for the origin of life, defies probability far more than does the spontaneous origin of life even given Hoyle's assumptions. Dawkins describes God as the Ultimate Boeing 747 gambit, an argument that philosopher Alvin Plantinga criticised by questioning Dawkins' contention that God is necessarily complex.

== See also ==
- Infinite monkey theorem
- Irreducible complexity
- Law of truly large numbers
- Objections to evolution
- Watchmaker analogy
- Weasel program
