= Natural Theology or Evidences of the Existence and Attributes of the Deity =

1802 book by William Paley

Natural Theology: Or, Evidences of the Existence and Attributes of the Deity, Collected from the Appearances of Nature
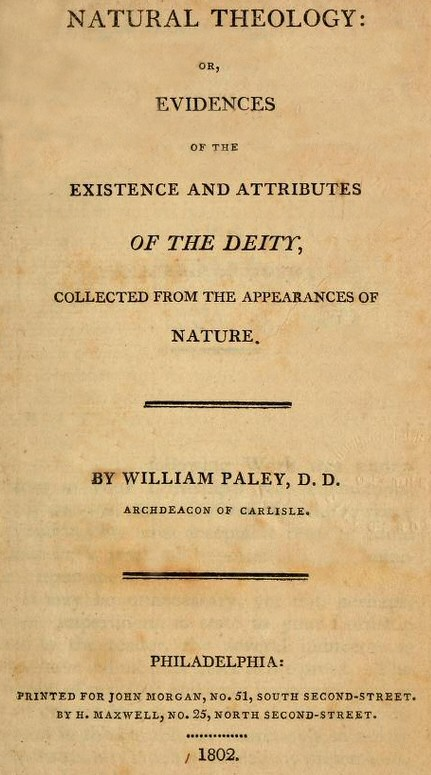
- Title Page of the first American edition
- Author: William Paley
- Language: English
- Genre: Christian apologetics, philosophy of religion
- Publisher: Robert Faulder, London; John Morgan, Philadelphia
- Publication date: 1802
- Pages: 586 (London)
- OCLC: 499272402

Natural Theology: Or, Evidences of the Existence and Attributes of the Deity is an 1802 work of Christian apologetics and philosophy of religion by the English clergyman William Paley (1743–1805). The book expounds his arguments from natural theology, making a teleological argument for the existence of God, notably beginning with the watchmaker analogy.

The book was written in the context of the natural theology tradition. In earlier centuries, theologians such as John Ray and William Derham, as well as philosophers of classical times such as Cicero, argued for the existence and goodness of God from the general well-being of living things and the physical world.

Paley's Natural Theology is an extended argument, constructed around a series of examples including finding a watch; comparing the eye to a telescope; and the existence of finely adapted mechanical structures in animals, such as joints which function like hinges or manmade ball and socket joints. Paley argues that these all lead to an intelligent Creator, and that a system is more than the sum of its parts. The last chapters are more theological in character, arguing that the attributes of God must be sufficient for the extent of his operations, and that God must be good because designs seen in nature are beneficial.

The book was many times republished and remains in print. It continues to be consulted by creationists. Charles Darwin took its arguments seriously and responded to them; evolutionary biologists such as Stephen Jay Gould and Richard Dawkins also responded to such ideas by referencing Paley's book.

== Context ==
The main thrust of William Paley's argument in Natural Theology is that God's design of the whole creation can be seen in the general happiness, or well-being, that is evident in the physical and social order of things. This sets the book within the broad tradition of the Enlightenment's natural theology; and this explains why Paley based much of his thought on John Ray (1691), William Derham (1711) and Bernard Nieuwentyt (1750).

Paley's argument is built mainly around anatomy and natural history. "For my part", he says, "I take my stand in human anatomy"; elsewhere he insists upon "the necessity, in each particular case, of an intelligent designing mind for the contriving and determining of the forms which organized bodies bear". In making his argument, Paley employed a wide variety of metaphors and analogies. Perhaps the most famous is his analogy between a watch and the world. Historians, philosophers and theologians often call this the watchmaker analogy. Building on this mechanical analogy, Paley presents examples from planetary astronomy and argues that the regular movements of the Solar System resemble the workings of a giant clock. To bolster his views he cites the work of his old friend John Law and the Dublin Astronomer Royal John Brinkley.

The germ of the idea is to be found in ancient writers who used sundials and Ptolemaic epicycles to illustrate the divine order of the world. These types of examples can be seen in the work of the ancient philosopher Cicero, especially in his De Natura Deorum, ii. 87 and 97. The watch analogy was widely used in the Enlightenment, by deists and Christians alike.

== Outline ==
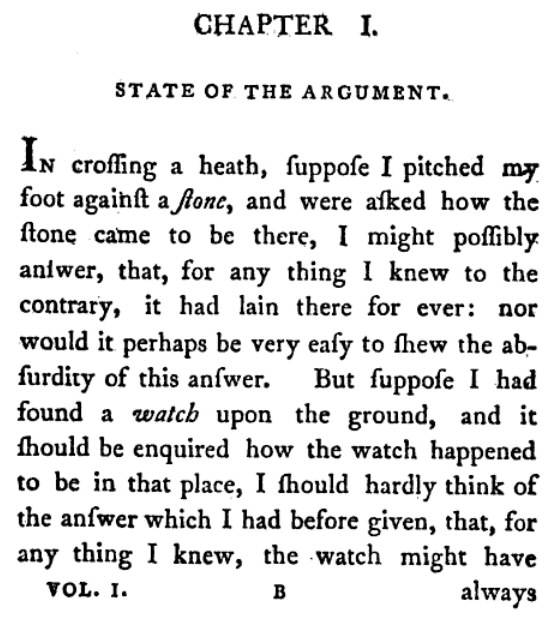
The first page of Natural Theology, introducing Paley's version of the watchmaker analogy

Chapter I. State of the Argument
The basic watchmaker analogy: if you find a watch, you suppose there's a watchmaker.

Chapter II. State of the Argument continued
Now the watch can reproduce itself. Paley argues that the watchmaker must have power, and specific intentions.

Chapter III. Application of the Argument
Paley says it is atheism not to agree with the watchmaker argument. He compares the eye to a telescope, and argues from the eye's construction.

Chapter IV Of the Succession of Plants and Animals
Paley argues from the properties of plant seeds and animal eggs.

Chapter V. Application of the Argument continued
The argument is extended to 'all the organized parts of the works of nature'. Paley considers whether chance alone could explain these, and concludes not.

Chapter VI. The Argument cumulative
No argument, writes Paley, other than 'the necessity of an intelligent Creator', can explain the eye (or any other elaborate living structure).

Chapter VII. Of the Mechanical And Immechanical Parts and Functions of Animals and Vegetables
Animals use muscles to move; even if we don't understand how they work, we can see they work mechanically, argues Paley, moving joints to and fro. Other organs such as the stomach work chemically to digest food.

Chapter VIII. Of Mechanical Arrangement in the human Frame
The bones and joints form a mechanical structure with features comparable to hinges, mortice and tenon and ball and socket joints, etc., to provide both support and suitable flexibility. He compares the spine to The Iron Bridge at Bishop Wearmouth.

Chapter IX. Of the Muscles
The muscles exactly relate to the joints, operating them mechanically like the wires and strings of a puppet. A complex case is the tongue. Sphincter muscles are admired also.

Chapter X. Of the Vessels of Animal Bodies
The blood vessels and lymph vessels are considered, the valves of the heart, and the separate functions of arteries and veins. Paley argues that such functions as that of the epiglottis could not have formed gradually (as by evolution).

Chapter XI. Of the Animal Structure regarded as a Mass
Paley considers the bilateral symmetry of animals, and how well-packaged all the delicate organs are, resulting in both beauty and utility.

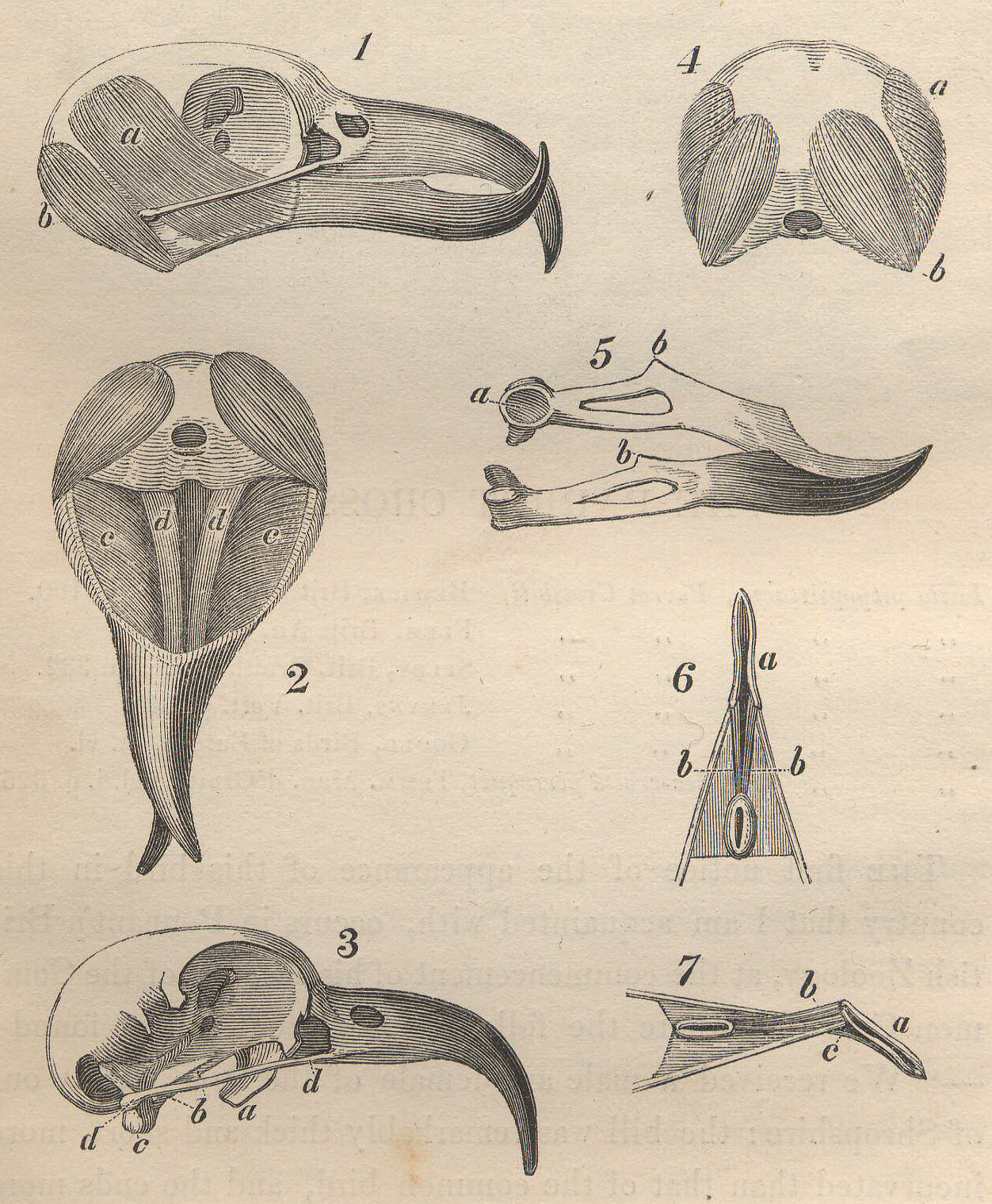
Red crossbill skull and jaw anatomy from William Yarrell's A History of British Birds; the crossbill's beak is cited by Paley as being well-suited to its function.

Chapter XII. Comparative Anatomy
Paley considers the equivalents of human anatomy in other animals. Human clothing is compared to the fur, feathers, quills and scales of animals. The structure of the feather is admired. The teeth and jaws of carnivores, herbivores and omnivores are considered. Similarly, the adaptations of birds' bills in species like the crossbill, spoonbill and (long-billed) snipe are discussed.

Chapter XIII. Peculiar Organizations
Paley considers organs which seem to have no comparison, like the oil glands of birds and swim bladders of fishes.

Chapter XIV. Prospective Contrivances
Paley considers how some structures are seen to be prepared for future function, like the milk-teeth of a baby, ready formed inside the gums at birth. Similarly, the circulation of the foetus is supported by temporary short-circuits with the foramen ovale and the ductus arteriosus, as the lungs are not yet in use for breathing.

Chapter XV. Relations
Paley considers how the whole of a system is more than the sum of its parts. This is seen to be so both in a mechanical watch and in living systems.

Chapter XVI. Compensation
The 'defects' of one organ are remedied by the structure of another. The elephant has, Paley argues, a short neck because its head is so heavy, but in compensation it has a long trunk, enabling it to reach out. Similarly the spider has no wings to enable it to chase its flying prey, but has a web, and organs adapted to produce it, which compensates for the lack.

Chapter XVII. The Relation of animated Bodies to inanimate Nature
Organs such as the wings of birds and the fins of fish are expressly adapted to the surrounding 'elements' of air or water in which they operate.

Chapter XVIII. Instincts
Instincts enable newly hatched young of salmon to find food, and later to migrate to the sea and finally back to their rivers to spawn.

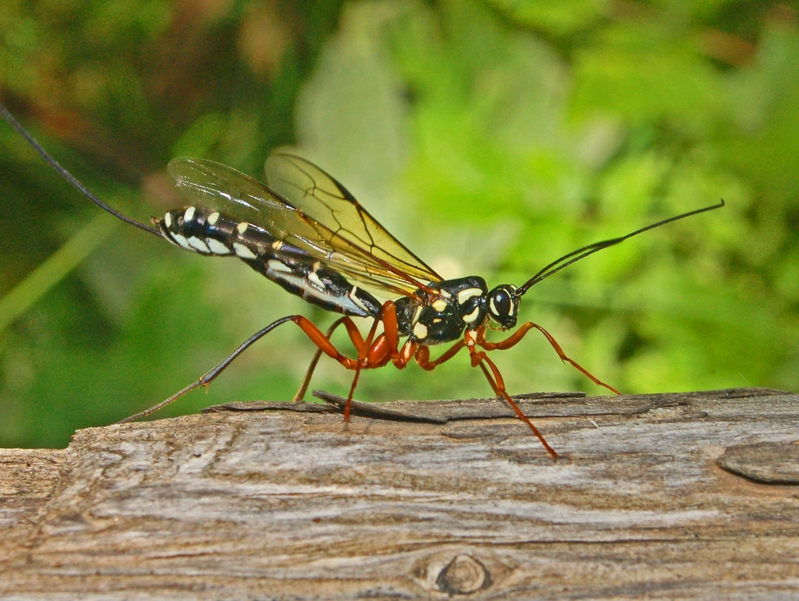
Paley mentions the ovipositors of insects such as ichneumons, able to lay eggs deep in wood.

Chapter XIX. Of Insects
"WE are not writing a system of natural history", begins Paley, apologising for not covering every class systematically. He mentions insects for some examples unique to them, as the antennae, elytra (scaly wing-cases), ovipositors (he calls them 'awls') for laying eggs deep in plants or wood, stings, the proboscis of bees, the light-producing organ of the glow-worm and so on.

Chapter XX. Of Plants
Admitting that plants generally have less obvious evidence of 'a designed and studied mechanism' than animals, still Paley adds some examples, as of the parts of the seed, the delicate germ being protected by a tough or spiny husk, and dispersed by wings or other appendages.

Chapter XXI. Of the Elements
Paley considers how the 'elements' of water, air etc. are exactly as needed.

Chapter XXII. Astronomy
Paley admits that astronomy is not the best proof of 'the agency of an intelligent Creator', but all the same it shows his magnificence.

Chapter XXIII. Personality of the Deity
All the above items show the 'contrivances' in existence, which Paley argues prove the personality of the Deity, arguing that only persons can contrive or design.

Chapter XXIV. Of the natural Attributes of the Deity
The attributes of God must, Paley argues, be 'adequate to the magnitude, extent, and multiplicity of his operations'.

Chapter XXV. Of the Unity of the Deity
Paley argues that the uniformity of plan seen in the universe indicates a single God.

Chapter XXVI. The Goodness of the Deity
God must be good, Paley argues, because in many cases the designs seen in nature are beneficial, and because animals perceive pleasure, beyond what would be strictly necessary. Pain is admitted to exist, but even such things as venomous bites of snakes exist to a good end, namely defence or the capture of prey. Pain too is mitigated, as in intervals between the acute pain of gout which are beneficial to sufferers. The appearance of chance, too, is necessary in the world.

Chapter XXVII. Conclusion
Paley concludes that natural theology offers many proofs of the goodness of God, though any one would be sufficient. The many proofs show that the conclusion is stable, and together they can make a suitable impression on those who study them.

== Editions ==
The first edition of Natural Theology: or, Evidences of the Existence and Attributes of the Deity was published in 1802 in London by J. Faulder. In the United States, the book was published and released by E Sargeant and Company of New York on December 15, 1802. A later edition published by E. S. Gorham contained revisions by F. LeGros Clark in order to "harmonize with modern science".

The book was republished in many editions by publishers in cities including London, Oxford, Cambridge, Edinburgh and Philadelphia. The twentieth reprint was made in 1820. Versions appeared in years including 1802, 1807, 1809, 1813, 1818, 1819, 1821, 1823, 1825, 1826, 1829, 1830, 1840, 1854 and many later years. The book remains in print, with more recent editions for example in 2006, 2008, 2009, 2010 and 2014. The book was also republished in editions of Paley's Collected Works. It has been translated into languages including French and Welsh.

== Topics of dispute ==
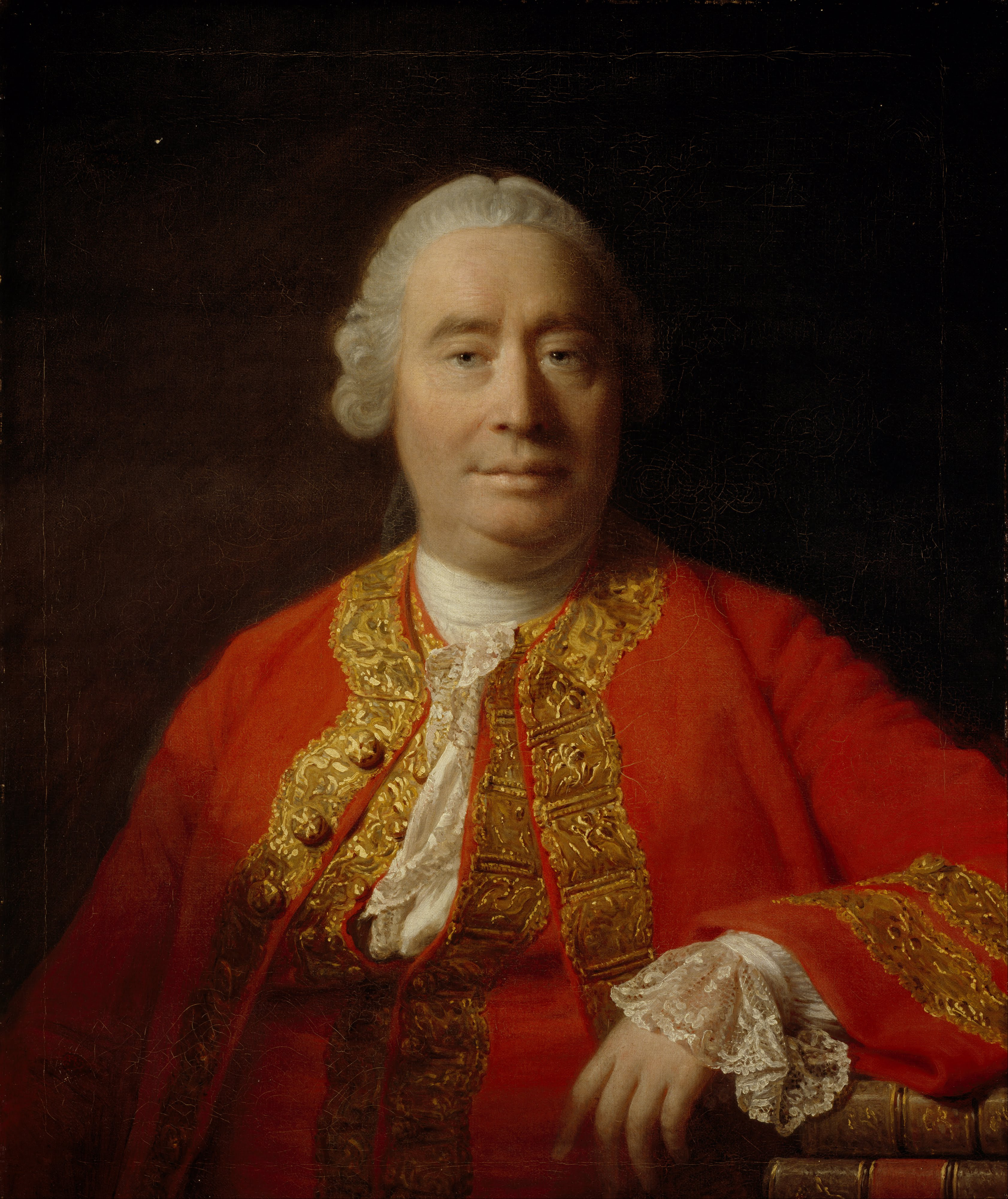
The Scottish philosopher David Hume, portrayed here by Allan Ramsay in 1766, criticised arguments from design; he did not live to see Paley's book.

=== Philosophy ===
The Scottish philosopher David Hume (who died in 1776, before Paley assembled his arguments into Natural Theology) had criticised arguments from design on several grounds. Firstly, he rejected the making of an analogy between the world and a human artifact such as a watch, since these are so dissimilar that any analogy must be very weak and unreliable. Secondly, Hume argued that even if one accepted the analogy, it would not prove that the creator is infinite, good, or perfectly intelligent, nor that there would be only one creator god. After all, wrote Hume, "what shadow of an argument... can you produce from your hypothesis to prove the unity of the Deity? A great number of men join in building a house or ship, in rearing a city, in framing a commonwealth; why may not several deities combine in contriving and framing a world?"

To counter the first argument, Paley strongly defended the analogy, emphasising complex mechanisms in living organisms seen as machines designed for purpose and contending that, in a sense "That an animal is a machine is neither correctly true nor wholly false". In replying to the second argument, Paley made a tactical retreat from traditional attributes of God to a more limited definition, in which unity went "no further than to a unity of counsel". It sufficed that God demonstrated plan, intelligence and foresight, had inconceivable power, and showed goodness through perceived design being beneficial in the clear majority of cases.

=== Evolutionary biology: Buffon and Erasmus Darwin ===
Early evolutionary ideas presented a new threat to the analogy between living organisms and designed object, as life differs in reproducing itself. In chapter XXIII Paley explicitly dismissed Buffon's concept of "organic molecules", then turned to an unattributed concept: "Another system, which has lately been brought forward, and with much ingenuity, is that of appetencies": the term and his description clearly refer to Erasmus Darwin's concept of transmutation of species, as set out in Zoonomia. Paley objected to it dispensing with "the necessity, in each particular case, of an intelligent, designing mind", and to it lacking evidence or observations of the process. More specifically, Darwin had adopted the common idea of inheritance of acquired characteristics, and Paley raised objections including the persistence of unused male nipples, and (discreetly put in Latin) the effect of circumcision not being inherited by generations of Jews.

Throughout the book, Paley presented difficulties in examples or analogies that had been presented to support evolutionary explanations or the doctrine of "appetencies". He objected that Erasmus Darwin's concept could only explain adaptation directly relating to activity, and could not explain passive adaptation.

== Opinions on Paley's arguments ==
=== Contemporary reception ===
The Edinburgh Review of 1803 commented that

With less learning and less originality than some of his distinguished predecessors [such as John Ray and William Derham, who are mentioned], it would be difficult, perhaps, to point out his superior in soundness of judgement, or in vigilant and comprehensive sagacity. With great strength of reasoning and power of decision, he has also united more moderation and liberality of sentiment, than is usually to be found among disputants; and added weight to his argument by a certain plainness and sobriety of manner, that is infinitely better calculated to produce conviction than the sallies of an ambitious eloquence.

The review agreed with Paley that "No thinking man, we conceive, can doubt that there are marks of design in the universe" and that either a single example like the eye would be conclusive, or no quantity of examples would be. Paley is praised for relying on "mechanical phenomena" rather than arguments about human intelligence.

The bible commentator William Jenks described the book in 1838 as "a work highly celebrated for the justness of its reflections, and the benevolence, good sense, and piety which it breathes."

=== Charles Darwin and evolutionary biology ===
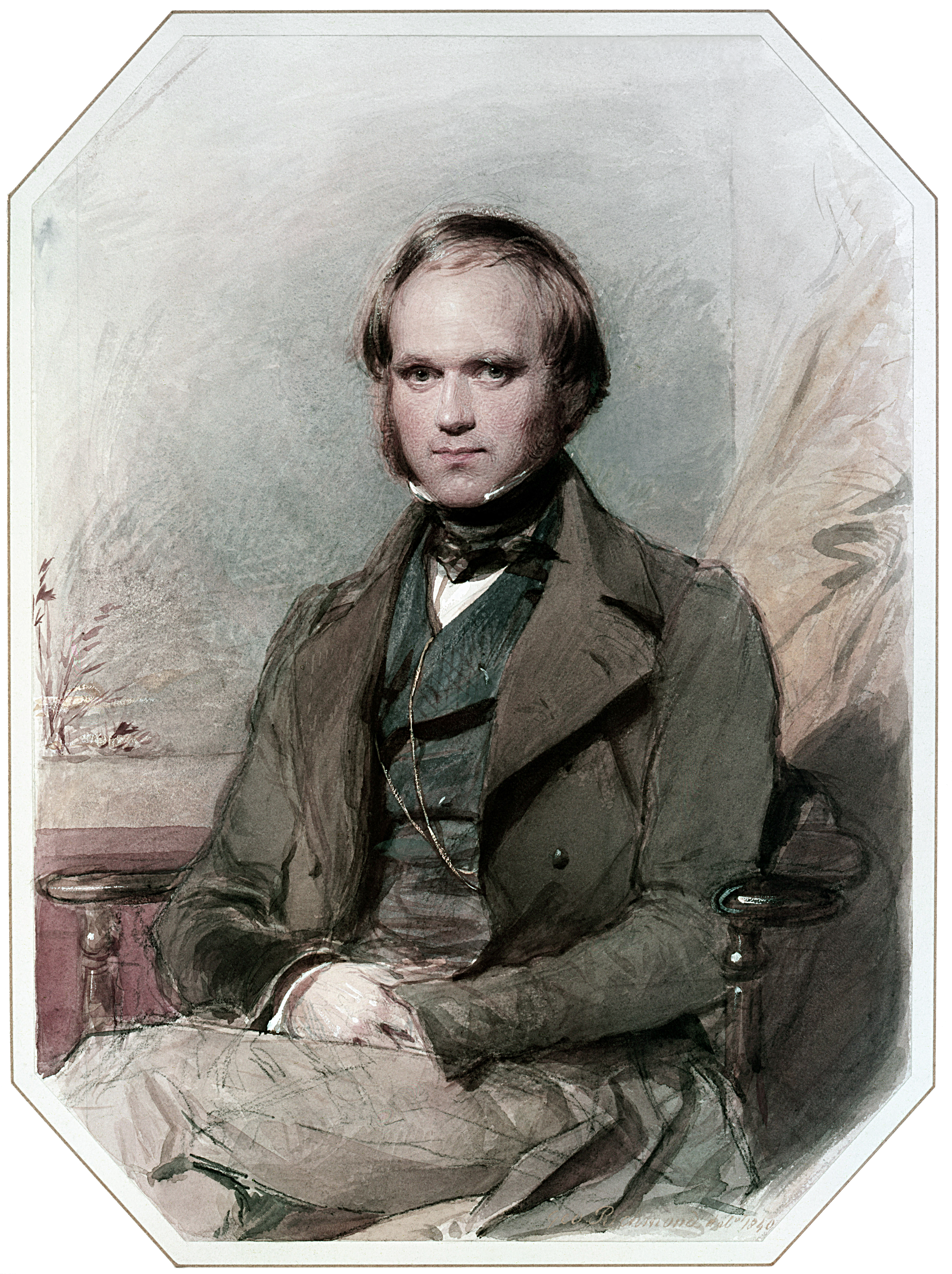
In the late 1830s, Charles Darwin re-read Paley's book.

Charles Darwin's studies at the University of Cambridge included two other texts by Paley, and in his final exams in January 1831 he did well in questions on these texts. He had to stay on until June, and read Paley's Natural Theology as well as John Herschel's Preliminary Discourse on the Study of Natural Philosophy and Alexander von Humboldt's Personal Narrative: these books inspired "a burning zeal" to research natural history. After the Beagle voyage he began development of his theory of natural selection, and in 1838 opened a notebook listing "books to be read", including "Paley's Nat. Theology". In 1859, on completing On the Origin of Species, he told a friend "I do not think I hardly ever admired a book more than Paley's Natural Theology: I could almost formerly have said it by heart."

He later stated in his autobiography that he was initially convinced by the argument:

Although I did not think much about the existence of a personal God until a considerably later period of my life, I will here give the vague conclusions to which I have been driven. The old argument of design in nature, as given by Paley, which formerly seemed to me so conclusive, fails, now that the law of natural selection has been discovered. We can no longer argue that, for instance, the beautiful hinge of a bivalve shell must have been made by an intelligent being, like the hinge of a door by man. There seems to be no more design in the variability of organic beings and in the action of natural selection, than in the course which the wind blows. Everything in nature is the result of fixed laws.

— Charles Darwin, The Autobiography of Charles Darwin

=== Modern evolutionary biology ===
In 1993 the evolutionary biologist Stephen Jay Gould compared Paley to Voltaire's Doctor Pangloss, the man who could argue any case (however hopeless). Gould is struck that Paley can claim that even the agonising pain of gallstones or gout could indicate the goodness of a loving God, with the justification that it felt so good when the pain stopped. Gould makes it clear he finds Paley's argument incorrect scientifically, but states that he respects it as a coherent and well-defended philosophy. Gould particularly respects Paley's method of identifying alternative possibilities and then systematically refuting them. Gould notes that Paley envisages a Lamarckist kind of evolution and rebuts it with the observation that men have not lost their nipples through disuse. However, Gould writes, Paley did not manage to think of one more alternative, natural selection, which has no purpose at all but just kills off whatever works less well in every generation.

The evolutionary biologist Richard Dawkins described himself as a neo-Paleyan in The Blind Watchmaker (1986), where he argued, following the evolutionary biologist and humanist Julian Huxley, that Paley's watch analogy fails to recognise the difference between the complexity of living organisms and that of inanimate objects. Living organisms can reproduce themselves, so they can change to become more complex from generation to generation. Inanimate objects such as watches are unable to pass on any changes, so they never become more complex unless a watchmaker redesigns them. The comparison breaks down, in Dawkins's view, because of this important distinction.

=== Creationism ===
Paley wrote decades before Darwin, was writing about the existence of God, and did not have anything to say about evolution. Some of the modern creationists have changed the conclusion of his arguments to be refutation of evolution. As such, they have been rejected by "virtually all biologists". Evolution has been widely accepted by scientists from Darwin onwards, and Darwin persuaded "most educated people" that processes such as evolution were governed by natural laws. This has not stopped creationists such as those in the Intelligent Design (ID) movement from continuing to use Paley's arguments:

Although proponents of ID claim that their premises differ from Paley's, and, unlike Paley, do not specify who or what the designer is, most evolutionary biologists see ID as a version of Paley's arguments updated to account for advances in our understanding of biology.

== See also ==
- Parson-naturalist

== Bibliography ==
- Burbridge, David (April 1998). "William Paley Confronts Erasmus Darwin: Natural Theology and Evolutionism in the Eighteenth Century". Science and Christian Belief. 10 (1). Archived from the original on 2 December 2020.
- Desmond, Adrian; Moore, James (1991). Darwin. London: Michael Joseph, Penguin Group. ISBN 978-0-7181-3430-3.
- Hume, David (1948). Dialogues Concerning Natural Religion (with introduction by Norman Kemp Smith ed.). Social Sciences Publishers.
- Paley, William (1802), Natural Theology: or, Evidences of the Existence and Attributes of the Deity (1st ed.), London: J. Faulder, ISBN 9780576291668

=== Editions ===
- William Paley (1802). Natural Theology: Or, Evidences of the Existence and Attributes of the Deity, Collected from the Appearances of Nature (1st ed.). London: Printed for R[obert] Faulder, New Bond-Street, by Wilks and Taylor, Chancery-Lane. OCLC 499272402.
- Natural Theology, Darwin online: 12th edition
- Natural Theology, Archive.org: 1879 Sheldon edition
