= Dialogues Concerning Natural Religion =

1779 philosophical work by David Hume

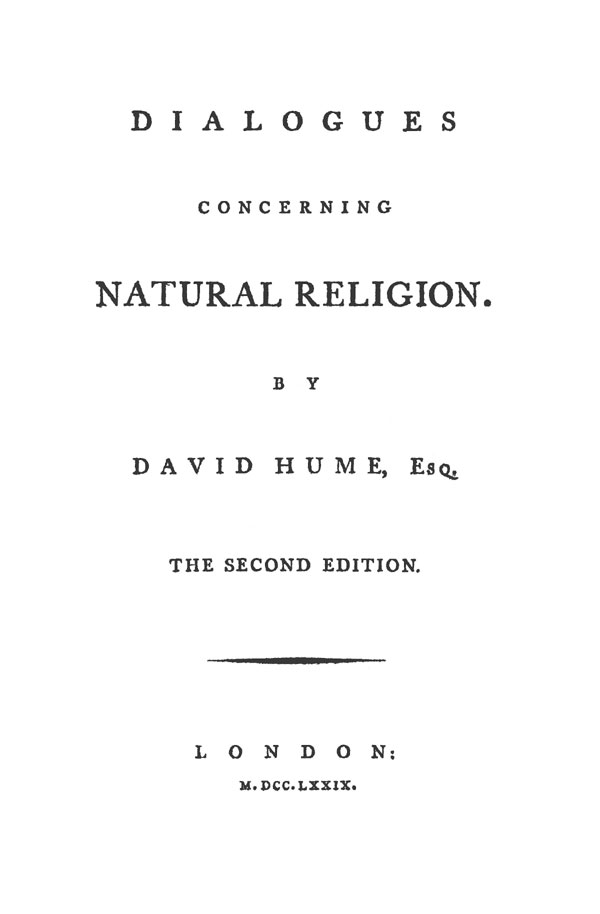
- Title page
- Author: David Hume
- Language: English
- Genre: Philosophy
- Publication date: 1779
- Publication place: United Kingdom

Dialogues Concerning Natural Religion is a philosophical work by the Scottish philosopher David Hume, first published in 1779. Through dialogue, three philosophers named Demea, Philo, and Cleanthes debate the nature of God's existence. Whether or not these names reference specific philosophers, ancient or otherwise, remains a topic of scholarly dispute. While all three agree that a god exists, they differ sharply in opinion on God's nature or attributes and how, or if, humankind can come to knowledge of a deity.

In the Dialogues, Hume's characters debate a number of arguments for the existence of God, and arguments whose proponents believe through which we may come to know the nature of God. Such topics debated include the argument from design—for which Hume uses a house as an analogy—and whether there is more suffering or good in the world (argument from evil).

Hume started writing the Dialogues in 1750 but did not complete them until 1776, shortly before his death. They are based partly on Cicero's De Natura Deorum. The Dialogues were published posthumously in 1779, originally with neither the author's nor the publisher's name.

== Characters ==
- Pamphilus is a youth present during the dialogues. In a letter, he reconstructs the conversation of Demea, Philo, and Cleanthes in detail for his friend Hermippus. He serves as the narrator throughout the piece. At the end of the Dialogues he believes that Cleanthes offered the strongest arguments. However, this could be out of loyalty to his teacher, as this does not seem to reflect Hume's own views on the topic. When other pieces on religion by Hume are taken into consideration, it may be noted that they all end with (apparently) ironic statements reaffirming the truth of Christian religious views. While the irony may be less readily evident in the Dialogues, this would suggest a similar reading of this work's ending. Cicero used a similar technique in his Dialogues.
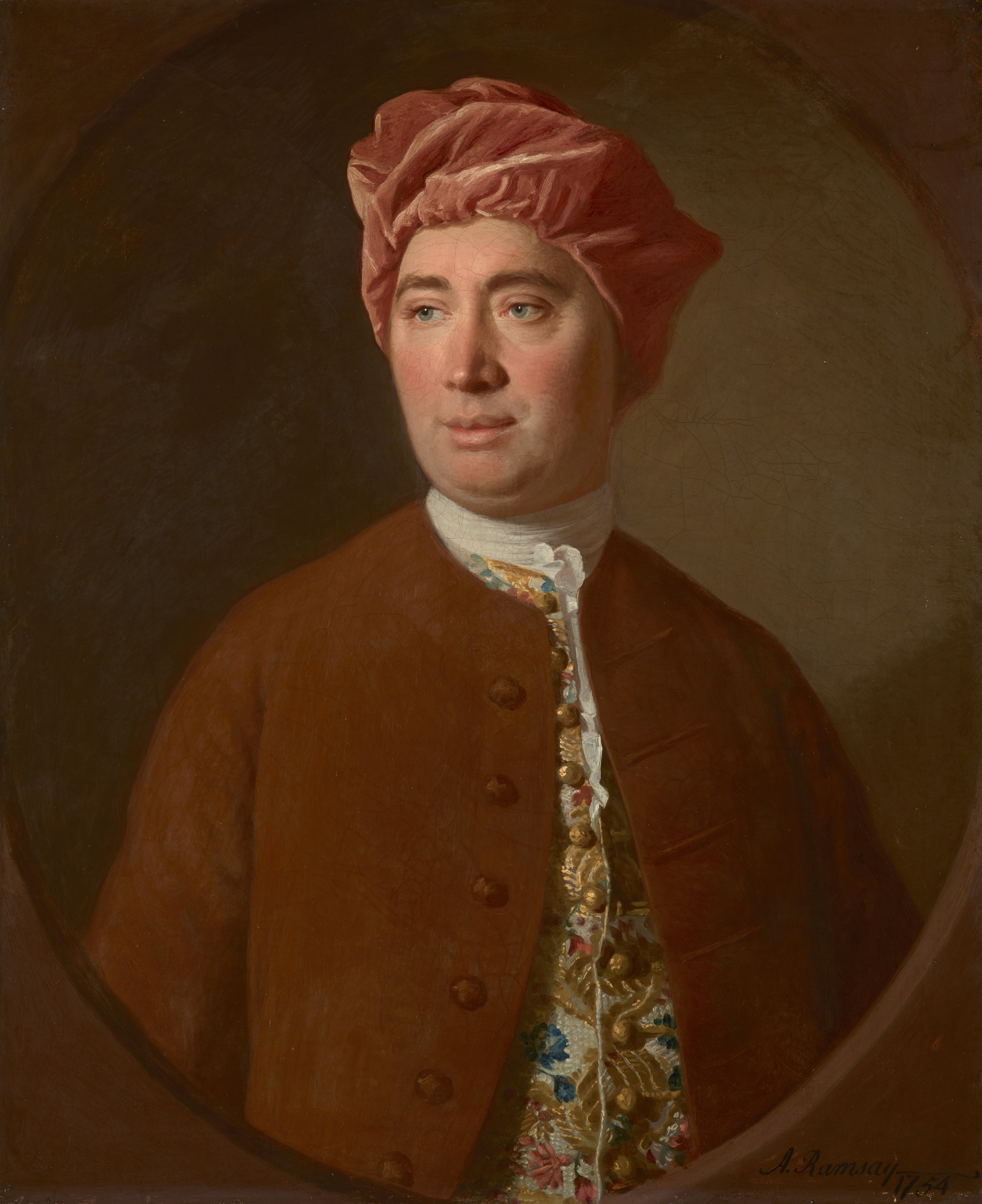
  David Hume
- Cleanthes is an "experimental theist: an exponent of orthodox empiricism" who bases his beliefs about God's existence and nature upon a version of the teleological argument which uses evidence of design in the universe to argue for God's existence and resemblance to the human mind.
- Philo, according to the predominant view among scholars, is the character who presents views most similar to those of Hume. Philo, along with Demea, attacks Cleanthes' views on anthropomorphism and teleology; while not going as far as to deny the existence of God, Philo asserts that human reason is wholly inadequate to make any assumptions about the divine, whether through a priori reasoning or observation of nature.
- Demea "defends the Cosmological argument and philosophical theism..." He believes that the existence of God should be proven through a priori reasoning and that our beliefs about the nature of God should be based upon revelation and fideism. Demea rejects Cleanthes' "natural religion" for being too anthropomorphic. Demea objects to the abandonment of the a priori arguments by Philo and Cleanthes (both of whom are empiricists) and perceives Philo to be "accepting an extreme form of skepticism."

== Impact ==
In The Blind Watchmaker (1986), evolutionary biologist Richard Dawkins discussed his decision to name his book after theologian William Paley's famous statement of the teleological argument, the watchmaker analogy, and noted that Hume's critique of the argument from design as an explanation of design in nature was the initial criticism that would ultimately be answered by Charles Darwin in On the Origin of Species (1859). In the second part of the Dialogues (1779), the character Philo observes that animal reproduction appears to be more responsible for the intricacies and order of animal bodies than intelligent design, stating:

But were we ever so much assured, that a thought and reason, resembling the human, were to be found throughout the whole universe, and were its activity elsewhere vastly greater and more commanding than it appears in this globe; yet I cannot see, why the operations of a world constituted, arranged, adjusted, can with any propriety be extended to a world which is in its embryo state, and is advancing towards that constitution and arrangement. By observation, we know somewhat of the economy, action, and nourishment of a finished animal; but we must transfer with great caution that observation to the growth of a foetus in the womb, and still more to the formation of an animalcule in the loins of its male parent. Nature, we find, even from our limited experience, possesses an infinite number of springs and principles, which incessantly discover themselves on every change of her position and situation.
