= The Blind Watchmaker (film) =

1987 film

- Based on: The Blind Watchmaker by Richard Dawkins
- Written by: Jeremy Taylor
- Presented by: Richard Dawkins
- Country of origin: United Kingdom
- Original language: English

Production
- Producer: Jeremy Taylor
- Running time: 48min

Original release
- Release: 1987

The Blind Watchmaker is a documentary where Richard Dawkins challenges William Paley's theories on creationism and takes on Paley's descendants. It was produced in 1987 by Jeremy Taylor and Richard Dawkins for BBC Horizon series and won the Sci-Tech Award for Best Science Documentary of the year. It was based on a book of the same name written by Dawkins in 1986.
