= The Blind Watchmaker =

Book by Richard Dawkins

- First edition cover
- Author: Richard Dawkins
- Language: English
- Subject: Evolutionary biology
- Publisher: Norton & Company, Inc
- Publication date: 1986
- Publication place: United Kingdom
- Media type: Print
- ISBN: 0-393-31570-3
- OCLC: 35648431
- Dewey Decimal: 576.8/2 21
- LC Class: QH366.2 .D37 1996
- Preceded by: The Extended Phenotype
- Followed by: River Out of Eden

The Blind Watchmaker: Why the Evidence of Evolution Reveals a Universe without Design (1986) is a popular science book by Richard Dawkins. It explains how the cumulative, nonrandom process of natural selection creates complexity. Dawkins develops themes from, and refutes criticisms of, his first book, The Selfish Gene (1976). It was illustrated by Liz Pyle.

It won the Los Angeles Times Book Prize for Current Interest and the Heinemann Award. An audiobook was released, read by Dawkins and Lalla Ward. A computer program of the same name was released and it was the basis for a BBC documentary of the same name. The Economist called it "As readable and vigorous a defense of Darwinism as has been published since 1859."

== Background ==
The title refers to the watchmaker analogy made by William Paley in Natural Theology or Evidences of the Existence and Attributes of the Deity (1802). Paley posited the complexity of living organisms was evidence of the existence of a divine creator. He argued by analogy with a watch compelling belief in the existence of a watchmaker. Charles Darwin, in On the Origin of Species (1859), argued that cumulative, nonrandom natural selection can create complexity. Dawkins dubs natural selection the blind watchmaker, "blind because it does not plan ahead, does not plan consequences, has no purpose in view. Yet the living results of natural selection overwhelmingly impress us with the illusion of design and planning. The purpose of this book is to resolve this paradox to the satisfaction of the reader."

== Synopsis ==
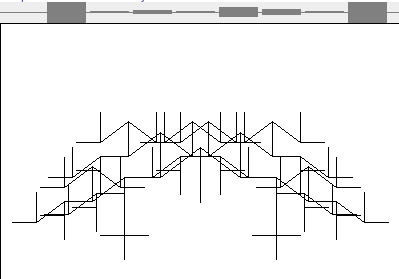
"Biomorph" that randomly evolves following changes of several numeric "genes", determining its shape; the gene values are given as bars on the top

1. Explaining the Very Improbable

Dawkins writes “We animals are the most complicated things in the known universe. … Complicated things, everywhere, deserve a very special kind of explanation." The explanation discovered by Charles Darwin and Alfred Russel Wallace is natural selection. Dawkins emphasizes that is nonrandom (since only adaptive traits are selected for) and cumulative (as adaptive traits accumulate).

2. Good Design

Dawkins looks at echolocation as an example of a complex adaptation. When Donald Griffin and Robert Galambos elucidated echolocation in bats, sonar was a secret. But nature invented it independently, to varying degrees.

3. Accumulating Small Change

Dawkins looks at the evolution of complexity. He notes that adaptations are too complex to have arisen by chance, and asks: "How then, did they come into existence? The answer, Darwin's answer, is by gradual, step-by-step transformations from simple beginnings. ... Each successive change in the gradual evolutionary process was simple enough, relative to its predecessor, to have arisen by chance. But the whole sequence of cumulative steps constitutes anything but a chance process. ... The cumulative process is directed by non-random survival."

Dawkins illustrates random variation coupled with nonrandom selection with his weasel program. He describes his experiences with a more sophisticated computer simulation of artificial selection implemented in the computer program The Blind Watchmaker, which was sold separately as a teaching aid.

4: Making Tracks Through Animal Space

Dawkins looks at convergent evolution, starting with the evolution of eyes. Many animals have a patch of light-sensitive cells. "In a continuous series from flat sheet of light-sensitive cells, through shallow cup to deep cup, each step in the series, however small (or large) the step, would be an optical improvement. Now, if you make a cup very deep and turn the sides over, you eventually make a lensless pinhole camera.” Such an eye is seen in the chambered nautilus. The addition of a lens results in the cephalopod eye. "For each of these types of eye, stages corresponding to evolutionary intermediates exist as working eyes among modern animals." In fact, eyes have evolved as many as forty times independently.

He returns to echolocation, noting that "Any animal that can hear at all may hear echoes. Blind humans frequently learn to make use of these echoes. A rudimentary version of such a skill in ancestral mammals would have provide ample raw material for natural selection to build upon, leading by gradual degrees to the high perfection of bats." Echolocation has evolved several times independently (in bats, cave swiftlets, oilbirds and cetaceans), another example of convergent evolution. In Australia, many marsupials have evolved to fill the ecological niches occupied by placental mammals on other continents. Similar environments create similar selective pressures, which shape similar adaptations.

5. The power and the archives

Dawkins looks at genetics. Gregor Mendel discovered that inheritance is particulate. R. A. Fisher unified Darwin and Mendel in the modern synthesis.

6. Origins and miracles

Dawkins looks at the origin of life, including the work of Graham Cairns-Smith.

7. Constructive evolution

Dawkins looks at evolutionary arms races between predator and prey, and the Red Queen's hypothesis. Gene duplication is introduced as a means of increasing genetic capacity. When a gene is copied, the new copy can evolve a new function.

8. Explosions and spirals

Dawkins looks at Darwin's concept of sexual selection, revived by Fisher. Peacocks evolved colorful plumage to attract peahens. But the peahens, in selecting for plumage, are also passing along genes preferring plumage. This is an example of linkage disequilibrium, which can lead to Fisherian runaway.

9. Puncturing punctualism

Dawkins looks at the punctuated equilibrium theory of Niles Eldredge and Stephen Jay Gould.

10. The one true tree of life

Dawkins looks at molecular taxonomy and Motoo Kimura's neutral theory of molecular evolution. Neutral mutations serve as molecular clocks that show us when species split.

11. Doomed rivals

Dawkins looks alternatives to natural selection, like Lamarckism, and finds them wanting.

In an appendix to the 1996 edition, Dawkins explains how his experiences with computer models led him to a greater appreciation of the role of embryological constraints on natural selection. In particular, he recognised that certain patterns of embryological development could lead to the success of a related group of species in filling varied ecological niches, though he emphasised that this should not be confused with group selection. He dubbed this insight the evolution of evolvability.

== Reception ==
E. O. Wilson wrote "It is deep enough to be useful to biologists, yet sufficiently simple and well-written (very well-written in fact) to appeal to the same large audience that enjoyed The Selfish Gene." John Maynard Smith, in New Scientist, wrote "I was repeatedly astonished at the clarity with which Dawkins sees the problems. ... I wish I could write like that." Isaac Asimov called it "A lovely book, original and lively, it expounds the ins and outs of evolution with clarity." John Gribbin, in the Good Book Guide, wrote "This might just be the most important evolution book since Darwin".

Tim Radford, writing in The Guardian, noted that despite Dawkins's "combative secular humanism", he had written "a patient, often beautiful book... that begins in a generous mood and sustains its generosity to the end." 30 years on, people still read the book, Radford argues, because it is "one of the best books ever to address, patiently and persuasively, the question that has baffled bishops and disconcerted dissenters alike: how did nature achieve its astonishing complexity and variety?" He included it in his science writing canon: "How evolution works - by someone who knows how to make words work."

Philosopher and historian of biology Michael T. Ghiselin, writing in The New York Times, writes that Dawkins "succeeds admirably in showing how natural selection allows biologists to dispense with such notions as purpose and design". He notes that analogies with computer programs have their limitations, but are still useful. Ghiselin observes that Dawkins is "not content with rebutting creationists" but goes on to press home his arguments against alternative theories to neo-Darwinism. He thinks the book fills the need to know more about evolution that creationists "would conceal from them." He concludes that "Readers who are not outraged will be delighted."

Kenneth R. Miller writes that Dawkins "brilliantly explains how complex mechanisms and structures are put together by the process of evolution" adding "It is true that he makes certain theological points that I don’t agree with."

Jerry Coyne writes: "I’ve always thought of Dawkins as an extremely smart child. He is not a child of course, he’s a really brilliant man. But he looks at things with the eyes of a child, in a way that I don’t think any scientist who wrote really well, including Stephen Jay Gould, ever could. He sees things with this fresh viewpoint that brings them alive."

The American philosopher of religion Dallas Willard denies the connection of evolution to the validity of arguments for God, asserting that Dawkins seems to consider the arguments to rest entirely on that basis. Willard argues that Chapter 6, "Origins and Miracles", attempts the "hard task" of making not just a blind watchmaker but "a blind watchmaker watchmaker", which he comments would have made an "honest" title for the book. He notes that Dawkins demolishes several "weak" arguments, such as the argument from personal incredulity. He denies that Dawkins's computer "exercises" and arguments from gradual change show that complex forms of life could have evolved. Willard concludes by arguing that in writing this book, Dawkins is not functioning as a scientist "in the line of Darwin", but as "just a naturalist metaphysician".

Steven Pinker calls it one of his favorite books: "Perhaps the best display of expository scientific prose of the 20th century. It gave me the idea to try my hand at the genre in The Language Instinct."

== Influence ==
The engineer Theo Jansen read the book in 1986 and became fascinated by evolution and natural selection. Since 1990 he has been building kinetic sculptures, the Strandbeest, capable of walking when impelled by the wind.

The journalist Dick Pountain described Sean B. Carroll's 2005 account of evolutionary developmental biology, Endless Forms Most Beautiful, as the most important popular science book since The Blind Watchmaker, "and in effect a sequel [to it]."

== See also ==
- "What Is It Like to Be a Bat?" (1974), essay by philosopher Thomas Nagel
- Endless Forms Most Beautiful (2005), book on evolutionary developmental biology by Sean B. Carroll
- The Blind Watchmaker (1987), BBC documentary based on Dawkins's book
