= The Design Revolution =

2004 book by William A. Dembski

- Cover
- Author: William A. Dembski
- Language: English
- Subject: Intelligent design
- Publisher: InterVarsity Press
- Publication date: 2004
- Publication place: United States
- Media type: Print
- Pages: 334
- ISBN: 0-8308-3216-5
- OCLC: 123119351
- Preceded by: No Free Lunch: Why Specified Complexity Cannot Be Purchased without Intelligence
- Followed by: Intelligent Design: The Bridge Between Science and Theology

The Design Revolution: Answering the Toughest Questions about Intelligent Design is a 2004 book by William A. Dembski, who supports intelligent design, and the idea that certain features of the universe and of living things are best explained by an intelligent cause, not a naturalistic process such as natural selection. The book is written in question/answer format from Dembski's point of view as one of the conceptual leaders in the movement. Each chapter is about 4 pages long and addresses one specific question. Dembski describes these questions as from his prior ten years experience in lectures, media interviews, and published criticism by the scientific community opposed to intelligent design, who constitute the majority of the scientific community and science education organizations. The foreword was written by Charles W. Colson.

In the preface Dembski states he is progressively more convinced that Intelligent Design will revolutionize science, and that revolutionaries must be willing to take abuse and ridicule by the ruling elite, in this case the "dogmatic Darwinists and scientific naturalists."

== Criticism ==
Mathematician Jeffrey Shallit criticises the book for evasion and dissembling. Mark Perakh mentions this book in his criticisms of Dembski, criticizing that the index does not contain the names of prominent critics.
