= Intelligent Design (book) =

1999 book by William Dembski

Intelligent Design: The Bridge Between Science and Theology
- Cover
- Author: William Dembski
- Language: English
- Subject: Intelligent design
- Publisher: InterVarsity Press
- Publication date: October 1999; October 17, 2007
- Publication place: United States
- Media type: Print (Hardcover and Paperback)
- Pages: 302
- ISBN: 0-8308-2314-X
- OCLC: 277247433
- Preceded by: The Design Inference
- Followed by: The Design Revolution: Answering the Toughest Questions about Intelligent Design

Intelligent Design: The Bridge Between Science and Theology is a 1999 book by the mathematician William A. Dembski, in which the author presents an argument in support of the pseudoscience of intelligent design. Dembski defines the term "specified complexity", and argues that instances of it in nature cannot be explained by Darwinian evolution, but instead are consistent with the intelligent design. He also derives an instance of his self-declared law of conservation of information and uses it to argue against Darwinian evolution. The book is a summary treatment of the mathematical theory he presents in The Design Inference (1998), and is intended to be largely understandable by a nontechnical audience. Dembski also provides a Christian theological commentary, and analysis of, what he perceives to be the historical and cultural significance of the ideas.

== Overview ==
Dembski begins by analyzing signs from God in the Bible, and notes that such signs have specificity and complexity, which enables them to be clearly discernible. He considers this to be a general insight regarding recognition of the "Divine Finger", and states, "My aim in this book is to take this premodern logic of signs and make it rigorous."

A review of naturalistic criticisms of miracles, particularly those by Benedict Spinoza and Friedrich Schleiermacher, follows. Dembski critiques the critiques, and derides the methodological naturalism that, he says, is part of their legacy.

He then focuses on the history of natural theology in Britain, recounting the teleological arguments of William Paley and Thomas Reid, and the primary reason for their demise, the Darwinian theory of evolution by natural selection. Upon introducing it, Dembski immediately criticizes it and commends the critique of Charles Hodge, who he says argued that Darwinism "was trying to subsume intelligent causation under physical causation."

Intelligent design, the central idea of the book, is then introduced. He distinguishes it from theistic evolution and, especially, purely naturalistic evolution. Explaining a motivation for it, he states, "Darwinism is the totalizing claim that [natural selection] accounts for all the diversity and complexity of life. The evidence simply does not support this claim.... [There] is always a temptation in science [to] think that one's theory encompasses a far bigger domain than it actually does." He lists numerous phenomena that he claims have proven to be "utterly intractable" for natural selection, including the origin of life, the origin of the genetic code, and the Cambrian explosion.

Then comes the technical theory. He introduces his complexity-specification criterion, which states that in order to infer design, three criteria must be met simultaneously: contingency, complexity, and specification. According to Dembski, the first rules out necessity; the latter two rule out chance. Combined with his universal probability bound of 10^{−150}, he claims that this criterion is completely accurate when applied to actual objects "with known underlying causal story."

Dembski derives what he purports to be an instance of what Peter Medawar (in 1984) identified as the law of conservation of information. However mathematician Jeffrey Shallit has rebutted this claim, stating that "Medawar’s 'law' is not the same as Dembski’s" in that Medawar "makes no mention of probabilities or the name Shannon", and that "Medawar’s law, by the way, can be made rigorous, but in the context of Kolmogorov information, not Shannon information or Dembski’s 'complex specified information'."

Dembski then introduces the term "complex specified information" (CSI), and claims that CSI is indicative of design. He considers whether the only known natural mechanisms of physical law and chance, alone or in combination, can generate such information, and concludes that they cannot. He argues that this is so because laws can only shift around or lose information, but do not produce it, and chance can produce complex unspecified information, or unspecified complex information, but not CSI; he provides a mathematical analysis that he claims demonstrates that law and chance working together cannot generate CSI, either.

Moreover, Dembski claims that CSI is holistic (with the whole being greater than the sum of the parts, and that this decisively eliminates Darwinian evolution as a possible means of its creation. He then enumerates the possible sources of CSI in biological organisms: inheritance, selection, and infusion. He states that the first two sources are "unable to account for the CSI in biological systems (and specifically for the irreducible complexity of certain biochemical systems...)", and therefore concludes that CSI must come from infusion. He further argues that biotic infusion cannot ultimately account for CSI, and so abiotic infusion must be the source.

Dembski maintains that by process of elimination, CSI is best explained as being due to intelligence, and is therefore a reliable indicator of design. He implies that his theory can be useful in several fields, including forensic science, intellectual property law, archaeology, and the search for extraterrestrial intelligence.

Dembski concludes the book with comments on what he sees as the theological implications of intelligent design. In an appendix, he offers answers to various objections to intelligent design.

== Reception ==
The physicist Victor J. Stenger criticized the book as "stealth creationism," and presenting an "argument from design" that "donned yet another set of clothes." Stenger further noted, "While he insists that this argument does not depend on any specific theological assumptions, his book unabashedly promotes his interpretation that the design inferred is the work of the Christian God."

Some criticisms also focuses on the technical theory presented, namely, specified complexity and Dembski's statements regarding the law of conservation of information. It has been argued that together they constitute nothing more than a re-statement of the second law of thermodynamics, which is known to permit the development of local concentrations of increased order in the universe provided that there is a counterbalancing increase in disorder elsewhere. Regarding physics, "When Dembski says that information cannot be generated naturally, he seems to be voicing yet another muddled version of the common creationist assertion that the second law forbids the generation of order by natural processes. Like his predecessors, he ignores the caveat "closed system" in the formal statement of the second law."

Dembski's reliance on such a controversial and unaccepted model is also not accepted in academia." Critics like Jason Rosenhouse, a mathematics professor, claim Intelligent Design contributes nothing to the discussion of evolution and intelligent design since Dembski's assertions ride on Behe's claim, and that claim is false.
