= The Design Inference =

Intelligent design book by William A. Dembski and Winston Ewert

The Design Inference: Eliminating Chance through Small Probabilities
- Cover of the first edition
- Author: William A. Dembski (both editions), Winston Ewert (second edition)
- Language: English
- Subject: Intelligent design
- Publisher: Cambridge University Press, Discovery Institute Press
- Publication date: September 13, 1998
- Publication place: United States
- Media type: Print (Hardcover and Paperback)
- Pages: 264 (first edition), 716 (second edition)
- ISBN: 0-521-62387-1
- Followed by: Intelligent Design: The Bridge Between Science and Theology

The Design Inference: Eliminating Chance through Small Probabilities is a book which sets out to establish approaches by which evidence of intelligent agency could be inferred in natural and social situations. Originally stemming from his 1996 doctoral dissertation, the first edition, written by American philosopher and mathematician William A. Dembski, a proponent of intelligent design, was published in 1998. It was revised in 2023 by Dembski and software engineer Winston Ewert. In the book they distinguish between three general modes of competing explanations in order of priority: regularity, chance, and design. The processes in which regularity, chance, and design are ruled out one by one until one remains as a reasonable and sufficient explanation for an event, are what they call an "explanatory filter". It is a method that tries to eliminate competing explanations in a systematic fashion including when a highly improbable event conforms to a discernible pattern that is given independently of the event itself. This pattern is what Dembski coined specified complexity. Throughout the book they use diverse examples such as detectability of spontaneous generation and occurrence of natural phenomena and cases of deceit like ballot rigging, plagiarism, falsification of data, etc.

The filter states that if the thing being examined cannot be explained by regularity, and if it is too statistically unlikely to be explained by chance, and contains "an independently given pattern", then it may be attributed to design. Dembski says the concept that he came up with is useful to those concerned with detecting design in different fields: forensic scientists, detectives, insurance fraud investigators, cryptographers, and SETI investigators, as well theologians and others who argue for the concepts of the fine-tuned universe and the Anthropic Principle.

== Reception ==
The Design Inference is specifically mentioned in the Wedge Strategy as an example of accomplishing one of the intelligent design movement's five year goals of "Thirty published books on design and its cultural implications (sex, gender issues, medicine, law, and religion). Described by the Discovery Institute as offering "a powerful alternative [to Darwinism]," the book is touted as being "published by major secular university publishers."

Some scientists from the SETI Institute and other fields, argue that they do not find application for Dembski's explanatory filter and the related concept of specified complexity, but rather base their work upon more prosaic methods and (in the case of SETI) a search for artificial simplicity.

In 2000, biologist Massimo Pigliucci criticized The Design Inference in BioScience writing, "Too bad he missed the solution to this riddle, which has been proposed several times during the last few centuries, most prominently (and in various fashions) by Hume (1779), Darwin (1859), and Jacques Monod (1971). According to these thinkers, if a given phenomenon occurs with low probability and also conforms to a pre-specified pattern, then there are two possible conclusions: intelligent design (this concept is synonymous with human intervention) or necessity, which can be caused by a nonrandom, deterministic force such as natural selection." Pigliucci wrote "Unfortunately, Cambridge University Press has offered a respectable platform for Dembski to mount his attack on 'materialist science'—which, of course, includes evolution. My hope is that scientists will not dismiss this book as just another craze originating in the intellectual backwaters of America. Neocreationism should be a call to arms for the science community. The battle is already raging, and scientists and educators are still not sure if they should even bother paying attention."

Marine biologist Wesley R. Elsberry and critic of creationism reviewed the book in 1999. Elsberry described the book as "...a slim and scholarly volume, as one expects from a distinguished academic press [with] clear writing, illustrative examples, and cogent argumentation. The work, though, is motivated and informed by an anti-evolutionary impulse, and its flaws appear to follow from the need to achieve an anti-evolutionary aim. The anti-evolutionary bent is not as overt here, though, as it is in other works by Dembski". Elsberry criticizes the book for using a definition of "design" as what is left over after chance and regularity have been eliminated, and for using an argument that excludes natural selection a priori in order to conclude the existence of a designer when in fact natural selection fits Dembski's argument just as easily. Elsberry concludes:

The Design Inference is a work with great significance for the group of anti-evolutionists who have embraced "intelligent design" as their organizing principle. TDI is supposed to establish the theoretical foundation for all the rest of the movement. My judgment is that it fails to lay a solid foundation. There are flaws and cracks that can admit the entry of naturalistic causes into the pool of "designed" events. It is unfortunate that Dembski's focus is the establishment of "intelligent design" as an anti-evolutionary alternative, for his insights into elimination of chance hypotheses would appear to have legitimate application to various outstanding research questions, such as resolving certain issues in animal cognition and intelligence. Despite Dembski's commentary in his First Things article, there appears to be no justification for the claim that biologists must now admit design (in its old, agency-laden sense) into biological explanation to any greater degree than it is already used.

— Elsberry, 1999
