= Mark Perakh =

Science writer (1924–2013)

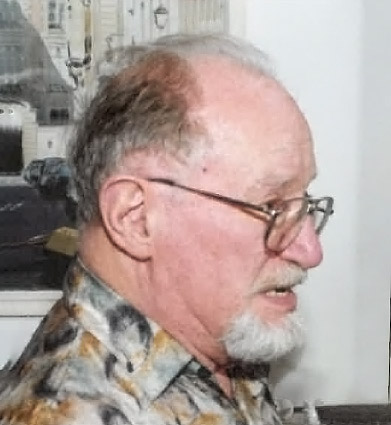
Mark Perakh

Mark Perakh (Russian: Марк Пэрах; perach (פֶּ֫רַח) is the Hebrew word for "flower"; born Mark Yakovlevich Popereka; 1924 – 7 May 2013) was a science writer. He was a professor emeritus of Mathematics and statistical mechanics at California State University, Fullerton in Fullerton, California.

Perakh taught physics, researched superconductivity, and wrote some 300 scientific papers, but his fame particularly comes from his writing about science and religion on Talk Reason, a website he helped found, and from his regular contributions to the blog The Panda's Thumb.

== Biography ==
Perakh was born in 1924 in Kiev, Ukraine. On August 28, 1958 Perakh (then Popereka), who at the time had been the head of a department in Kazakh Agricultural University in Almaty (then Alma-Ata) and K.S.Frusin (department assistant) were sentenced for "badmouthing" the Soviet government and for spreading leaflets calling to vote against candidates in the then forthcoming elections to the Supreme Soviet of the USSR. Some of Perakh's short stories were inspired by his stay in the gulag.

In 2003, Perakh published Unintelligent Design (Prometheus Books, ISBN 1-59102-084-0), a book that is critical of Intelligent Design, and he is particularly skeptical of some of the arguments proposed by William Dembski, which he states are pseudomathematical. He also wrote critically of Old Earth creationist astronomer Hugh Ross, and has responded to claims by Jonathan Wells that the lack of published research by creationists contradicting the prevailing scientific consensus is due to a conspiracy he likens to Lysenkoism in the former USSR.

Perakh was also interested in Bible codes, which he believed are ridiculous.

Perakh's other published books include a technical volume on the subject of thin films, which has been translated into eight languages, and the novel Man in a Wire Cage (originally titled by the author "Train in a Wire Cage" but changed by the publisher) (1988, ISBN 1-55547-257-5). His website also has a section on Russian oral jokes (anekdoty) and short stories he has written in English and Russian.

Perakh died of leukemia on May 7, 2013 in his home in Hidden Meadows outside Escondido, California.

== Publications ==
- Unintelligent Design (Prometheus Books, 2003) ISBN 1-59102-084-0
- Man in a Wire Cage (Critics Choice Paperbacks, August 1988) ISBN 1-55547-257-5
