= Joseph Shallit =

American novelist (1915–1995)

- Shallit c. 1965
- Born: Joseph Shaltz; February 7, 1915; Philadelphia, Pennsylvania, U.S.
- Died: June 13, 1995 (aged 80)
- Occupations: Novelist; author
- Spouse: Louise Lee Outlaw Shallit
- Children: 2, including Jeffrey
- Writing career
- Genres: Mystery fiction; science fiction

Joseph Shallit (February 7, 1915 — June 13, 1995) was an American mystery novelist and science fiction author.

== Early life ==
He was the son of Russian-Jewish immigrants from Vitebsk in present-day Belarus. He was born in Philadelphia under the name Joseph Shaltz. This name was the result of a clerical error affecting his parents when they emigrated from Russia, and he changed it back to "Shallit" in November 1942.

== Career ==
He was instrumental in getting the regulation against photography in Independence Hall changed when he was arrested for taking a photo of the Liberty Bell in 1942. He was a reporter at the time for The Philadelphia Record. Subsequent to this event, the rule was changed.

Shallit served in the Army Signal Corps in the Philippines during World War II. Upon his return, he began to write, publishing his first mystery, The Billion-Dollar Body, in 1947 with Lippincott. Other mysteries include Yell Bloody Murder, Lady, Don't Die on My Doorstep, and Kiss the Killer. Take Your Last Look was published under the pseudonym "Matt Brady". He also wrote a number of short stories for science fiction magazines, including "Education of a Martian", in the August 1952 issue of Galaxy Science Fiction. A short story, entitled "Margie Passes", was published in Hallie and Whit Burnett's 1951 first volume of the anthology-series continuation of Story, and later was adapted by John Tobias into one segment of a 1972 ABC television drama produced by Fred Coe, entitled "Of Men and Women" and starring Deborah Raffin.

Shallit later worked for Pennsylvania Railroad, later Conrail, editing an employee magazine that they published. He retired in 1980, and died of Alzheimer's disease on June 13, 1995.

He was married to Louise Lee Outlaw Shallit, an author, and was survived by two sons, Jonathan Shallit, a music professor and Jeffrey Shallit, a computer scientist.
