= David M. Goldschmidt =

American mathematician (born 1942)

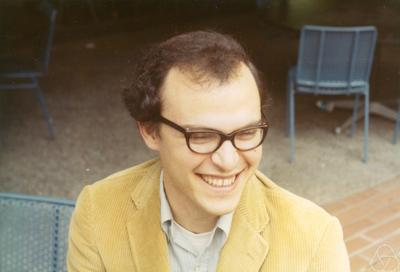
David Goldschmidt

David M. Goldschmidt (born 21 May 1942, New York City) is an American mathematician specializing in group theory.

Goldschmidt received in 1969 from the University of Chicago a Ph.D. under John Griggs Thompson with thesis On the 2-exponent of a finite group. From 1969 to 1971 he was a Gibbs Instructor at Yale University. From 1971 to 1989 he was on the faculty of the mathematics department at the University of California, Berkeley. In 1989–1991 he was Deputy Director and in 1991 he became Director of the Institute for Defense Analyses's Center for Communication Research in Princeton, New Jersey.

Goldschmidt published his amalgam method for finite groups in 1980. In the 1980s this method was important for new developments in the local structure theory of finite groups. In addition to his work on the amalgam method, Goldschmidt has done research on the representation theory of finite groups and has written a book on algebraic curves without the sophisticated approach of modern algebraic geometry.

In 2012 he was elected a Fellow of the American Mathematical Society. His doctoral students include Jeffrey Shallit.

== Selected publications ==
- Algebraic functions and projective curves, Springer 2002
- Group characters, symmetric functions and the Hecke Algebra, American Mathematical Society 1993
- with Alberto Delgado and Bernd Stellmacher: Groups and graphs: new results and methods, Birkhäuser 1985
- Lectures on character theory, Publish or Perish 1980
