= Journal of Integer Sequences =

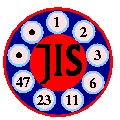
- Discipline: Integer sequences
- Language: English
- Edited by: Jeffrey Shallit

Publication details
- History: 1998–present
- Publisher: University of Waterloo
- Frequency: Irregular
- Open access: Yes

Standard abbreviations
- ISO 4: J. Integer Seq.

Indexing
- ISSN: 1530-7638
- OCLC no.: 42458787

Links
- Journal homepage; Online access

The Journal of Integer Sequences is a peer-reviewed open-access academic journal in mathematics, specializing in research papers about integer sequences.

It was founded in 1998 by Neil Sloane. Sloane had previously published two books on integer sequences, and in 1996 he founded the On-Line Encyclopedia of Integer Sequences (OEIS). Needing an outlet for research papers concerning the sequences he was collecting in the OEIS, he founded the journal. Since 2002 the journal has been hosted by the David R. Cheriton School of Computer Science at the University of Waterloo, with Waterloo professor Jeffrey Shallit as its editor-in-chief. There are no page charges for authors, and all papers are free to all readers. The journal publishes approximately 50–75 papers annually.

In most years from 1999 to 2014, SCImago Journal Rank has ranked the Journal of Integer Sequences as a third-quartile journal in discrete mathematics and combinatorics. It is indexed by Mathematical Reviews and Zentralblatt MATH.
