= Jeffrey Shallit =

American computer scientist

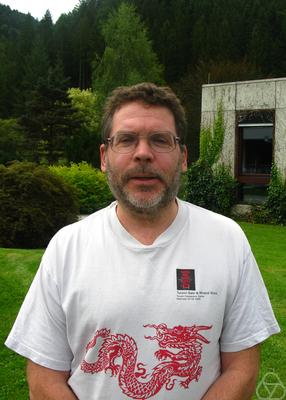
- Shallit in 2010
- Born: October 17, 1957 (age 68); Philadelphia, Pennsylvania, U.S.
- Education: Princeton University (BA); University of California, Berkeley (PhD)
- Scientific career
- Fields: Formal language theory Computational number theory
- Workplaces: University of Waterloo
- Thesis: Metric Theory of Pierce Expansions (1983)
- Doctoral advisor: Manuel Blum; David M. Goldschmidt

Jeffrey Outlaw Shallit (born October 17, 1957) is an American computer scientist and mathematician. He is an active number theorist and a noted critic of intelligent design. He is married to Anna Lubiw, also a computer scientist.

== Early life and education ==
Shallit was born in Philadelphia, Pennsylvania, in 1957. His father was journalist Joseph Shallit, the son of Jewish immigrants from Vitebsk, Russia (now in Belarus). His mother was Louise Lee Outlaw Shallit, a writer. He has one brother, Jonathan Shallit, a music professor.

Shallit earned a Bachelor of Arts (B.A.) in mathematics from Princeton University in June 1979. He received a Ph.D., also in mathematics, from the University of California, Berkeley, in June 1983. His doctoral thesis was entitled Metric Theory of Pierce Expansions and his advisor was Manuel Blum.

== Advocacy ==
Since 1996, Shallit has held the position of Vice-President of Electronic Frontier Canada.

In 1997, he gained attention for the publication on the Internet of Holocaust Revised: Lies of Our Times (also called the Shallit Report), a reprint of an article he had written for a Waterloo student publication in 1993, which detailed the backgrounds and past statements of various persons whom he accused of being Holocaust deniers, notably David Irving, Fred A. Leuchter, and Eustace Mullins. This triggered a public exchange of letters between him and Irving.

Shallit has been a critic of the work of William Dembski promoting intelligent design. He has coauthored a paper with Wesley Elsberry demonstrating problems with Dembski's mathematical work, and would have appeared as a witness opposing Dembski in the Kitzmiller v. Dover trial had Dembski not dropped out.

== Professional life ==
As of 2024 Shallit is a Professor in the School of Computer Science at the University of Waterloo and the editor-in-chief of the Journal of Integer Sequences. His primary academic interests are combinatorics on words, formal languages, automata theory, and algorithmic number theory. He was elected an ACM Distinguished Member in 2008.

His publications include the books Algorithmic Number Theory (with Eric Bach), a noted text on algorithms, Automatic Sequences: Theory, Applications, Generalizations (with Jean-Paul Allouche), and A Second Course in Formal Languages and Automata Theory.

== See also ==
- List of University of Waterloo people
