= William A. Dembski =

American mathematician and philosopher (born 1960)

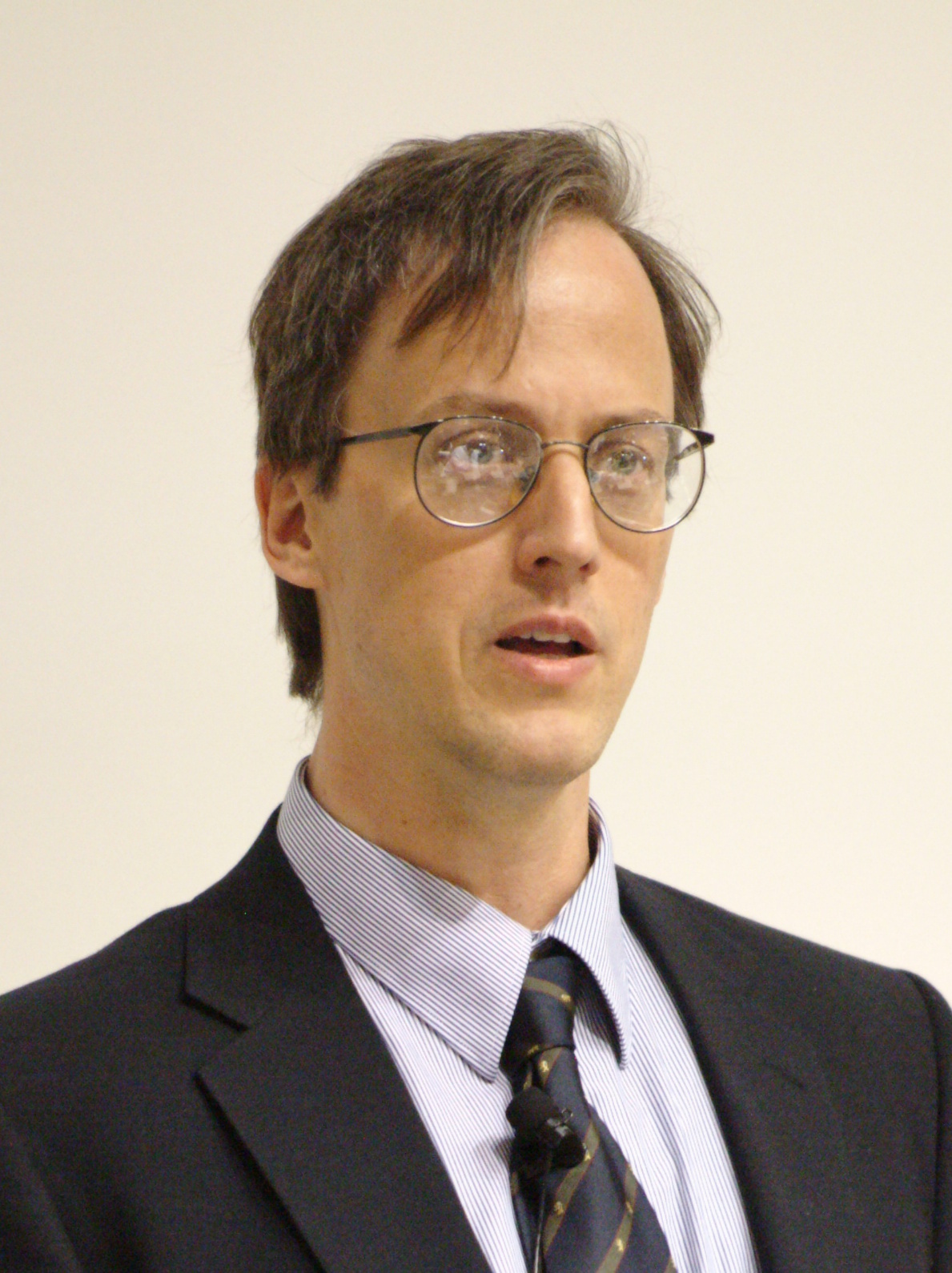
- Dembski in 2006
- Born: July 18, 1960 (age 66); Chicago, Illinois, U.S.
- Known for: Specified complexity
- Notable work: The Design Inference (1998); Intelligent Design (1999); The Design Revolution (2004)
- Awards: Trotter Prize (2005)

Education
- Education: University of Illinois at Chicago (BA, MS, MA, PhD); University of Chicago (MS, PhD); Princeton Theological Seminary (MDiv)
- Thesis: The design inference: Eliminating chance through small probabilities (1996)
- Doctoral advisor: Dorothy Grover
- Scientific career
- Fields: Probability theory Theoretical computer science
- Thesis: Chaos, uniform probability, and weak convergence (1988)
- Doctoral advisor: Leo Kadanoff; Patrick Billingsley
- Other academic advisors: Andrew Yao
- Website: billdembski.substack.com BillDembski.com

William Albert Dembski (born July 18, 1960) is an American mathematician, philosopher, and theologian. He was a proponent of intelligent design (ID), a pseudoscientific argument for the existence of God. He coined the intelligent design argument of specified complexity.

After earning a doctorate in mathematics from the University of Chicago in 1988 and a second doctorate from the University of Illinois Chicago in philosophy in 1996, Dembski taught as a professor at the Michael Polanyi Center of Baylor University. He was a professor at the Southern Baptist Theological Seminary from 2006 to 2012, then a professor at Southern Evangelical Seminary from 2012 to 2013. He was also a senior fellow at the Center for Science and Culture (CSC) of the Discovery Institute, but officially retired from intelligent design and resigned from the CSC on September 23, 2016.

Dembski has written books about intelligent design, including The Design Inference (1998), Intelligent Design: The Bridge Between Science & Theology (1999), The Design Revolution (2004), The End of Christianity (2009), and Intelligent Design Uncensored (2010). He has postulated that probability theory can be used to prove both specified complexity and irreducible complexity. The scientific community sees intelligent design—and Dembski's concept of specified complexity—as a form of creationism.

== Early life ==
William Albert Dembski was born in Chicago, Illinois, on July 18, 1960. He was the only child of Catholic parents. His mother, Ursula, was an art dealer, and his father, William J. Dembski, was a professor of evolutionary biology who earned a D.Sc. in biology from the University of Erlangen-Nuremberg after studying at the University of Illinois on the GI Bill. Dembski described his mother as having "lost any Christian belief" after she read the works of Hermann Hesse, and his father as a secularist who "was never a dogmatic Darwinist".

While growing up, Dembski was neither particularly religious nor did he question the theory of evolution. He received his first communion at age seven and was confirmed into the Catholic Church at age 13, but recalled that "I rejected many of the standard doctrines, such as the deity of Christ and the reality of hell". After being schooled in Evanston, Illinois, he attended Portsmouth Abbey School in Rhode Island. He finished high school a year early, excelling in math and finishing a calculus course in one summer. In his final year, Dembski marked down his religious affiliation as Hindu in a school questionnaire out of disdain for Catholicism and Christianity as a whole: "I had no intention of returning to Roman Catholicism, or to any form of Christianity for that matter".

After high school, Dembski enrolled at the College of the University of Chicago at age 17 and took advanced courses in mathematics there. Despite achieving higher than a 3.8 grade point average out of 4.0, he dropped out after experiencing personal and social difficulties at the school. He then began working at his mother's oil painting business, during which time he read works on creationism and the Bible. In May 1979, after having previously rejected organized religion, Dembski accepted Christianity and converted.

=== Education ===
Dembski later returned to college and graduated with honors from the University of Illinois Chicago (UIC) with a Bachelor of Arts in psychology in 1981 and a Master of Science in mathematical statistics in 1983. As an undergraduate, he won a memorial prize for the "best undergraduate research paper in psychology" and was awarded a three-year fellowship provided by the National Science Foundation. He then earned a second M.S. in pure mathematics in 1985 and a Ph.D. in mathematics from the University of Chicago in 1988. His doctoral dissertation at Chicago, completed under physicist Leo Kadanoff and mathematician Patrick Billingsley, was titled, "Chaos, uniform probability, and weak convergence". While obtaining his doctorate, Dembski taught undergraduate mathematics at the University of Chicago as a lecturer from 1987 to 1988.

After receiving his doctorate in mathematics, Dembski was a postdoctoral fellow in mathematics at the Massachusetts Institute of Technology (MIT), where he conducted research in probability theory in 1988. He became a postdoctoral fellow researching chaos theory and probability at the James Franck Institute in 1989, then a research associate in computer science at Princeton University in 1990 studying cryptography and complexity theory. While at Princeton on a NSF Grant, Dembski was supervised by computer scientist Andrew Yao. He then became a postdoctoral fellow in philosophy at Northwestern University, where he taught philosophy of religion, from 1992 to 1993. He returned to the University of Illinois Chicago and obtained a third master's degree, a Master of Arts in philosophy, in 1993.

In 1996, Dembski earned both a Master of Divinity (M.Div.) from Princeton Theological Seminary and his second doctorate, a Ph.D. in philosophy, from the University of Illinois at Chicago. His second doctoral dissertation, completed under Dorothy Grover, was titled, "The design inference: Eliminating chance through small probabilities". The thesis won a university award for the most "outstanding dissertation in fine arts and humanities". Afterwards, Dembski once again became a postdoctoral fellow, this time at the University of Notre Dame, where he taught philosophy and religion from 1996 to 1997.

== Career ==
=== Discovery Institute ===
Instead of finding another university position, Dembski became a postdoctoral research fellow at the Center for Science and Culture (CSC) at the Discovery Institute (DI) in 1996. He was among the center's first class of research fellows and was given the position of "Blaise Pascal Fellow in Probability and Information Sciences". From 1997 to 1999, he was an adjunct assistant professor of philosophy at the University of Dallas. Dembski played a central role in the CSC's extensive public and political campaigns advocating for intelligent design and its teaching in public schools through the "Teach the Controversy" campaign and became a senior fellow at the CSC. But, in September 2016, Dembski resigned from his positions at the CSC and "resigned my formal associations with the ID community". Later, a February 2021 interview in the CSC's blog Evolution News announced "his return to the intelligent design arena".

=== Baylor University ===
==== Michael Polanyi Center controversy ====
In 1999, Dembski was invited by Robert B. Sloan, the president of Baylor University, to become the executive director at Baylor's new Michael Polanyi Center (named after polymath Michael Polanyi). Dembski described it as "the first intelligent design think tank at a research university". Dembski had first met Sloan in 1996, when he was a teacher at a Christian summer camp near Waco, Texas, where Sloan's daughter was studying. Sloan had read some of Dembski's work and, according to Dembski, "made it clear that he wanted to get me on the faculty in some way". His salary was supported by a grant from the John Templeton Foundation.

The Polanyi Center was established without much publicity in October 1999, initially consisting of two people: Dembski and a like-minded colleague, Bruce L. Gordon, who were both hired directly by Sloan without going through the usual channels of a search committee and departmental consultation. The majority of Baylor staff did not know of the center's existence until its website went online. The center's mission, and the lack of consultation with the Baylor faculty, became the immediate subject of controversy.

In April 2000, Dembski hosted a conference on "naturalism in science" sponsored by the John Templeton Foundation and the hub of the intelligent design movement, the Discovery Institute, seeking to address the question "Is there anything beyond nature?". A majority of Baylor faculty members boycotted the conference. A few days later, the Baylor faculty senate voted 27–2 to dissolve the center and merge it with Baylor's Institute for Faith and Learning. President Sloan refused, citing issues of censorship and academic integrity, but agreed to convene an outside committee to review the center. The committee recommended setting up a faculty advisory panel to oversee the science and religion components of the program, dropping the name "Michael Polanyi" and reconstituting the center as part of the Institute for Faith and Learning. These recommendations were accepted in full by the university administration.

In a subsequent press release, Dembski asserted that the committee had given an "unqualified affirmation of my own work on intelligent design," that its report "marks the triumph of intelligent design as a legitimate form of academic inquiry" and that "dogmatic opponents of design who demanded the Center be shut down have met their Waterloo. Baylor University is to be commended for remaining strong in the face of intolerant assaults on freedom of thought and expression". Dembski's remarks were criticized by other members of the Baylor faculty, who protested that they were both an unjustified attack on his critics at Baylor and a false assertion that the university endorsed Dembski's controversial views on intelligent design. Charles Weaver, a psychology and neuroscience professor at Baylor, said, "In academic arguments, we don't seek utter destruction and defeat of our opponents. We don't talk about Waterloos."

Dembski was relieved of his position as director by Sloan on October 19, 2000; he remained an associate professor at Baylor's Institute for Faith and Learning. In a statement, Dembski criticized faculty efforts to remove him as "intellectual McCarthyism". Professor Michael Beaty, director of the Institute for Faith and Learning, said that Dembski's remarks violated the spirit of cooperation that the committee had advocated and stated that "Dr. Dembski's actions after the release of the report compromised his ability to serve as director."

=== Seminary teaching ===
In 2005, Dembski left Baylor and became the first director of the Center for Theology and Science at the Southern Baptist Theological Seminary. He was also named the school's Carl F. H. Henry Professor of Theology and Science, beginning on June 1, 2005. He left the school in May 2006. In June 2006, he became a professor of philosophy at Southwestern Baptist Theological Seminary (SWBTS) in Fort Worth, Texas, and taught a number of courses there in philosophy of religion. In 2012, he moved from SWBTS to Southern Evangelical Seminary in Charlotte, North Carolina, and taught as its Phillip E. Johnson Research Professor in Culture and Science until 2013, when he ceased teaching altogether. In 2015, he retired from his position as an academic editor at the Foundation for Thought and Ethics, which he had held since 1997.

==== Baylor Evolutionary Informatics Lab controversy ====
Subsequently, in July and August 2007, Dembski played a central role in the formation of the Evolutionary Informatics Lab (EIL), cofounded with Baylor University Engineering Professor Robert J. Marks II. According to Baylor administration, the EIL website hosted at Baylor was deleted because it violated university policy forbidding professors from creating the impression that their personal views represent Baylor as an institution. Dembski says the website was removed because it dealt with intelligent design. Baylor said they would permit Marks to repost his website on their server, provided a 108-word disclaimer accompany any intelligent design-advancing research to make clear that the work does not represent the university's position. The site now resides on a third-party server and still contains the material advancing intelligent design. Dembski's participation was funded by a $30,000 grant from the Lifeworks Foundation, which is controlled by researcher Brendan Dixon of the Biologic Institute (which has close ties to the Discovery Institute).

==== Southwestern Baptist Theological Seminary flood controversy ====
While serving as a professor at Southwestern Baptist Theological Seminary, Dembski wrote The End of Christianity, which argued that a Christian can reconcile an old Earth creationist view with a literal reading of Adam and Eve in the Bible by accepting the scientific consensus of a 4.5 billion year of Earth. He further argued that Noah's flood likely was a phenomenon limited to the Middle East. This caused controversy and Dembski's reading of the Bible was criticized by Tom Nettles, a young Earth creationist, in The Southern Baptist Journal of Theology, Southern Seminary's official theological journal. In 2010, the dean of Southwestern's School of Theology, David Allen, released a white paper defending Dembski's statement and criticizing Nettles for misunderstanding the book. Southwestern Seminary president Paige Patterson, a young Earth creationist, "said that when Dembski's questionable statements came to light, he convened a meeting with Dembski and several high-ranking administrators at the seminary. At that meeting, Dembski was quick to admit that he was wrong about the flood. "'Had I had any inkling that Dr. Dembski was actually denying the absolute trustworthiness of the Bible, then that would have, of course, ended his relationship with the school,' he said."

=== Other ===
In December 2001, Dembski launched the International Society for Complexity, Information and Design (ISCID), of which he was the executive director and the editor-in-chief of its journal, Progress in Complexity, Information, and Design (PCID).

Dembski is a member of the American Scientific Affiliation, the Evangelical Philosophical Society (where he was once vice president), and the American Mathematical Society. He is also a senior fellow of the Wilberforce Forum.

Dembski was awarded the 2005 Trotter Prize by Texas A&M University.

== Public advocacy ==
Dembski frequently gives public talks, principally to religious, pro-ID groups, and creationists. Barbara Forrest and Paul R. Gross noted that Dembski has not been hesitant in associating with young Earth creationists, such as attending conferences with Carl Baugh.

Dembski, along with fellow Discovery Institute associates Michael Behe and David Berlinski, tutored Ann Coulter on science and evolution for her book Godless: The Church of Liberalism (2006). Approximately one-third of the book is devoted to polemical attacks on evolution, which Coulter, as Dembski often does, terms "Darwinism."

Dembski participated in the documentary film Expelled: No Intelligence Allowed, released in 2008. Dembski told the Southern Baptist Texan that those who need to see the movie are the "parents of children in high school or college, as well as those children themselves, who may think that the biological sciences are a dispassionate search for truth about life but many of whose practitioners see biology, especially evolutionary biology, as an ideological weapon to destroy faith in God." Dembski has appeared on several television shows, including a 2005 interview with Jon Stewart on The Daily Show with Edward Larson and Ellie Crystal where he said he accepted religion before science.

=== Writing ===
In 1998, Dembski published his first book, The Design Inference: Eliminating Chance through Small Probabilities, which became a Cambridge University Press bestselling philosophical monograph.

In 2002, Dembski published his book No Free Lunch: Why Specified Complexity Cannot Be Purchased without Intelligence. Dembski's work was strongly criticized within the scientific community, which argued that there were a number of major logical inconsistencies and evidential gaps in Dembski's hypothesis. David Wolpert, co-creator of the No free lunch theorem on which Dembski based his book, characterized his arguments as "fatally informal and imprecise," "written in jello," reminiscent of philosophical discussion "of art, music, and literature, as well as much of ethics" rather than of scientific debate.

Mathematician Mark Perakh has stated he believes Dembski overemphasizes his own self-importance in his writing.

=== The Inner Life of the Cell copyright controversy ===
In November 2007, a graduate student named S. A. Smith brought an apparent case of wholesale academic misuse of unlicensed content to public attention. She noticed that a video used by Dembski in his lecture was identical to The Inner Life of the Cell animation created by Harvard University and XVIVO Scientific Animation. The audio track giving a scientific explanation was stripped off and the video was used with an alternative narration. The matter was brought to the attention of Harvard and XVIVO. David Bolinsky, creator of the video, wrote that Dembski was warned about using the video without permission.

In response to the allegations, Dembski has claimed that he downloaded the video from the Internet, and added a voiceover narration that he deemed appropriate for his audience. According to Dembski, the downloaded version omitted the opening credits but contained the closing credits, which were shown to the audience. However, Smith later documented several instances where images from the Harvard/XVIVO animation were apparently removed from his book The Design of Life (2008) but the related footnotes and references were not. indicating that Dembski was already aware that permission had been denied for him to use the animation when he delivered his presentation at the University of Oklahoma.

On April 9, 2008, Expelled: No Intelligence Allowed, a movie Dembski appears in, was given a cease-and-desist by XVIVO accusing Premise Media, the Expelled producers, of plagiarism concerning the same video. A June 2008 Premise Media press release announced Premise Media and XVIVO, LLC, "reached an agreement" noting "XVIVO has agreed that the Premise Media documentary does not infringe on any of XVIVO's intellectual property rights."

== Views ==
=== Early opposition to evolution ===
It was in 1988 at a conference on randomness that Dembski began to believe that there was purpose, order, and design in the universe by the intervention of God.

Dembski holds that his knowledge of statistics and his skepticism concerning evolutionary theory led him to believe that the extraordinary diversity of life was statistically unlikely to have been produced by natural selection. His first significant contribution to intelligent design was his 1991 paper, "Randomness by Design," published in the philosophy journal Noûs.

Former UC Berkeley law school professor Phillip E. Johnson's book Darwin on Trial (1991) attracted a group of scholars who shared his view that the exclusion of supernatural explanations by the scientific method was unfair and had led to the Edwards v. Aguillard ruling that teaching creation science in public schools was unconstitutional. Dembski was part of that group at a symposium at Southern Methodist University in Dallas, Texas, in March 1992, before they came to call themselves "The Wedge."

Dembski wrote a contribution to the 1994 book The Creation Hypothesis. Another chapter, contributed by the creationists Charles Thaxton and Walter L Bradley, discussed "design detection" and redefined "specified complexity" as a way of measuring information. These ideas led to Dembski's notion of specified complexity, which he developed in The Design Inference, a 1998 revision of his PhD dissertation in philosophy.

In 1987, the phrase "intelligent design" replaced "creation science" in drafts of a book, Of Pandas and People, that was intended for secondary school students. The phrase referred to the idea that life was created through unspecified processes by an intelligent but unidentified designer. The book asserted that there was a logical need for such a designer because of the appearance of design in biological organisms. This replacement was intended to evade the Edwards v. Aguillard ruling. The book was published in 1989 amidst campaigning by the publisher for the introduction of "intelligent design" into school science classes.

Biochemist Michael Behe, another member of "The Wedge," contributed the argument that he subsequently called "irreducible complexity" to a subsequent edition of Pandas in 1993. The book contained concepts which Dembski later elaborated in his treatment of "specified complexity."

=== Evolution ===
Dembski does not accept universal common descent. His mainstream scientific critics have accused him of dishonesty in his representation of scientific facts and writing, and he has also been criticised by the traditional creationist community for not supporting the young Earth creationist position, though this community does defend some of his other arguments.

==== Science vs. naturalism ====
Dembski objects to the presence of the theory of evolution in a variety of disciplines, presenting intelligent design as an alternative to reductionist materialism that gives a sense of purpose that the unguided evolutionary process lacks and the ultimate significance of ID is its success in undermining materialism and naturalism. Dembski has also stated that ID has little chance as a serious scientific theory as long as methodological naturalism is the basis for science. Although intelligent design proponents (including Dembski) have made little apparent effort to publish peer-reviewed scientific research to support their hypotheses, in the late 1990s and 2000s, they made vigorous efforts to promote the teaching of intelligent design in schools. Dembski is a strong supporter of this drive as a means of making young people more receptive to intelligent design, and said he wants "to see intelligent design flourish as a scientific research program" among a "new generation of scholars" willing to consider the theory and textbooks that include it.

==== Specified complexity ====
Specified complexity is a concept which Dembski has proposed and used in his works promoting intelligent design, an argument intended to give a formal definition of patterns that are both specified and complex. He claims it is a reliable marker of design by an intelligent agent, a central concept of intelligent design, as opposed to natural selection in modern evolutionary theory. The concept of specified complexity is widely regarded as mathematically unsound and has not been the basis for further independent work in information theory, complexity theory, or biology. Specified complexity is one of the two main arguments used by intelligent design proponents, the other being irreducible complexity.

=== Intelligent design and Christianity ===
In his book Intelligent Design: The Bridge Between Science & Theology he states "The conceptual soundings of the [intelligent design] theory can in the end only be located in Christ." On his website, DesignInference.com, Dembski said that intelligent design provides an intellectual basis to restore Christian philosophy over materialism.

Dembski has also spoken of his motivation for supporting intelligent design in a series of Sunday lectures in the Fellowship Baptist Church in Waco, Texas, the last of which took place on March 7, 2004. Answering a question, Dembski said it was to enable God to receive credit for creation.

=== Intelligent design movement ===
Dembski sees intelligent design as being a popular movement as well as a scientific hypothesis and claims that it is in the process of dislodging evolution from the public imagination. At the CSICOP's 4th World Skeptics Conference, held on June 20–23, 2002, in Burbank, California, he told the audience that "over the next twenty-five years ID will provide the greatest challenge to skepticism." He asserted that "ID is threatening to be mainstream," and that polls show 90 percent support for the hypothesis, indicating that it has "already becom[e] mainstream within the public themselves." "The usual skeptical retorts are not going to work against ID" and ID "turns the tables on skepticism."

Evolution, in his view, "is the ultimate status quo" and "squelches dissent." Young people, who "love rebellion" see that and are attracted to ID as a result. "The public supports intelligent design. The public is tired of being bullied by an intellectual elite." He contends that skeptics resort to rhetoric and "artificially define ID out of science," admitting only materialistic explanations as legitimate. ID "paints the more appealing world picture," whereas skepticism works by being negative, which "doesn't set well with the public... To most people evolution doesn't provide a compelling view."

== Personal life ==
Dembski met his wife, Jana, while they were both students at Princeton Theological Seminary. They have one daughter and two sons.

== Selected publications ==
=== Books ===
Sole author

- Dembski, William A. (1988). Chaos, Uniform Probability, and Weak Convergence (Thesis (PhD)). Chicago, IL: University of Chicago, Department of Mathematics. LCCN 94629367. OCLC 31515673.
- —— (1998). The Design Inference: Eliminating Chance through Small Probabilities. Cambridge; New York: Cambridge University Press. ISBN 978-0-521-62387-2. LCCN 98003020. OCLC 38551103.
- —— (1999). Intelligent Design: The Bridge Between Science & Theology. Downers Grove, IL: InterVarsity Press. ISBN 978-0-8308-1581-4. LCCN 99037141. OCLC 41628252.
- —— (2002). No Free Lunch: Why Specified Complexity Cannot Be Purchased without Intelligence. Lanham, MD: Rowman & Littlefield. ISBN 978-0-7425-1297-9. LCCN 2001031791. OCLC 46858256.
- —— (2004). The Design Revolution: Answering the Toughest Questions about Intelligent Design. Foreword by Charles W. Colson. Downers Grove, IL: InterVarsity Press. ISBN 978-0-8308-3216-3. LCCN 2003020589. OCLC 53058980.
- —— (2009). The End of Christianity: Finding a Good God in an Evil World. Nashville, TN: B&H Publishing Group. ISBN 978-0-8054-2743-1. LCCN 2010280674. OCLC 311762223.

Co-author

- Dembski, William A.; Wells, Jonathan (2008). How to be an Intellectually Fulfilled Atheist (or not) (1st ed.). Wilmington, DE: ISI Books. ISBN 978-1-933-85984-2. LCCN 2008934995. OCLC 232128215.
- ——; —— (2008). Dembski, William A. (ed.). The Design of Life: Discovering Signs of Intelligence in Biological Systems. Dallas: Foundation for Thought and Ethics. ISBN 978-0-9800213-0-1. LCCN 2009281462. OCLC 183624199.
- ——; McDowell, Sean (2008). Understanding Intelligent Design: Everything You Need to Know in Plain Language. Eugene, OR: Harvest House Publishers. ISBN 978-0-7369-2442-9. LCCN 2008014216. OCLC 222249640.
- ——; Witt, Jonathan (2010). Intelligent Design Uncensored: An Easy-to-Understand Guide to the Controversy. Downers Grove, IL: IVP Books. ISBN 978-0-8308-3742-7. LCCN 2010000917. OCLC 460060932.

As editor or contributor

- Dembski, William A., ed. (1998). Mere Creation: Science, Faith & Intelligent Design. Foreword by Henry F. Schaefer, III. Downers Grove, IL: InterVarsity Press. ISBN 978-0-8308-1515-9. LCCN 98020999. OCLC 38959771.
- Amos, Gary; Gardiner, Richard (1998). Dembski, William A. (ed.). Never Before in History: America's Inspired Birth. Pandas Publications. Foreword by Thomas G. West. Dallas, TX: Haughton Publishing Company. ISBN 978-0-914513-51-3. LCCN 98072936. OCLC 41105490.
- Cole, Deborah D.; Duran, Maureen Gallagher (1998). Dembski, William A. (ed.). Sex and Character. Pandas Publications. Foreword by Joe S. McIlhaney, Jr., MD. Dallas, TX: Haughton Publishing Company. ISBN 978-0-914513-50-6. LCCN 98072932. OCLC 41068752.
- Behe, Michael J.; Dembski, William A.; Meyer, Stephen C. (2000). Science and Evidence for Design in the Universe: Papers Presented at a Conference Sponsored by the Wethersfield Institute, New York City, September 25, 1999. Proceedings of the Wethersfield Institute. Vol. 9. San Francisco, CA: Ignatius Press. ISBN 978-0-89870-809-7. LCCN 00102374. OCLC 45720008.
- Dembski, William A.; Kushiner, James M., eds. (2001). Signs of Intelligence: Understanding Intelligent Design. Grand Rapids, MI: Brazos Press. ISBN 978-1-58743-004-6. LCCN 00067612. OCLC 45499842.
- ——; Richards, Jay Wesley, eds. (2001). Unapologetic Apologetics: Meeting the Challenges of Theological Studies. Foreword by Phillip E. Johnson. Downers Grove, IL: InterVarsity Press. ISBN 978-0-8308-1563-0. LCCN 00047173. OCLC 45136696.
- Richards, Jay W., ed. (2002). Are We Spiritual Machines?: Ray Kurzweil vs. the Critics of Strong A.I. Contributions by George Gilder, Ray Kurzweil, John Searle, William Dembski, Michael Denton, and Thomas S. Ray (1st ed.). Seattle, WA: Discovery Institute Press. ISBN 978-0-9638654-3-4. LCCN 2002101330. OCLC 59273082.
- Wiker, Benjamin (2002). Moral Darwinism: How We Became Hedonists. Foreword by William A. Dembski. Downers Grove, IL: InterVarsity Press. ISBN 978-0-8308-2666-7. LCCN 2002004052. OCLC 49383607.
- Dembski, William A.; Ruse, Michael, eds. (2004). Debating Design: From Darwin to DNA. New York: Cambridge University Press. ISBN 978-0-521-82949-6. LCCN 2004047363. OCLC 54826160. "Papers from a conference, entitled Design and its Critics, held at Concordia University, Mequon, Wis., June 22–24, 2000."
- Dembski, William A., ed. (2004). Uncommon Dissent: Intellectuals Who Find Darwinism Unconvincing. Foreword by John Wilson. Wilmington, DE: ISI Books. ISBN 978-1-9322-3631-6. LCCN 2004102726. OCLC 55653649.
- Simmons, Geoffrey (2004). What Darwin Didn't Know: A Doctor Dissects the Theory of Evolution. Foreword by William Dembski. Eugene, OR: Harvest House Publishers. ISBN 978-0-7369-1313-3. LCCN 2003015099. OCLC 52621437.
- Dembski, William A., ed. (2006). Darwin's Nemesis: Phillip Johnson and the Intelligent Design Movement. Foreword by Rick Santorum. Downers Grove, IL: IVP Academic. ISBN 978-0-8308-2836-4. LCCN 2005033144. OCLC 62330745.
- Flannery, Michael A. (2008). Alfred Russel Wallace's Theory of Intelligent Evolution: How Wallace's World of Life Challenged Darwinism: With an Abridged Version of The World of Life. Edited, with an introduction by Michael A. Flannery; foreword by William A. Dembski. Riesel, TX: Erasmus Press. ISBN 978-0-9815204-1-4. LCCN 2009921870. OCLC 340792516.
- Dembski, William A.; Downs, Wayne J.; Frederick, Justin B. A., eds. (2008). The Patristic Understanding of Creation: An Anthology of Writings from the Church Fathers on Creation and Design. Riesel, TX: Erasmus Press. ISBN 978-0-981-52040-7. LCCN 2008930284. OCLC 233055054.
- ——; Schirrmacher, Thomas, eds. (2008). Tough-minded Christianity: Honoring the Legacy of John Warwick Montgomery. Foreword by Paige Patterson. Nashville, TN: B&H Publishing Group. ISBN 978-0-8054-4783-5. LCCN 2009282507. OCLC 233935324.
- ——; Licona, Michael R., eds. (2010). Evidence for God: 50 Arguments for Faith from the Bible, History, Philosophy, and Science. Grand Rapids, MI: Baker Books. ISBN 978-0-8010-7260-4. LCCN 2010005990.
- Gordon, Bruce L.; Dembski, William A., eds. (2011). The Nature of Nature: Examining the Role of Naturalism in Science. Wilmington, DE: ISI Books. ISBN 978-1-935-19128-5. LCCN 2010031418. OCLC 326569291.
