= Intelligent design =

Pseudoscientific argument for the existence of God

Intelligent design (ID) is a pseudoscientific argument for the existence of God, presented by proponents as "an evidence-based scientific theory about life's origins". ID presents two main arguments against evolutionary explanations: irreducible complexity and specified complexity, asserting that certain biological and informational features of living things are too complex to be the result of natural selection, but these assertions have been rebutted by detailed scientific examination, and evolutionary explanations they claimed to be impossible had been published in peer reviewed research.

The leading proponents of ID are associated with the Discovery Institute, a Christian, politically conservative think tank based in the United States. (Note: "Kitzmiller v. Dover Area School District Trial transcript: Day 6 (October 5), PM Session, Part 1". TalkOrigins Archive. Houston: The TalkOrigins Foundation, Inc. "Q. Has the Discovery Institute been a leader in the intelligent design movement? A. Yes, the Discovery Institute's Center for Science and Culture. Q. And are almost all of the individuals who are involved with the intelligent design movement associated with the Discovery Institute? A. All of the leaders are, yes." — Barbara Forrest, 2005, testifying in the Kitzmiller v. Dover Area School District trial.: Wilgoren 2005, "...the institute's Center for Science and Culture has emerged in recent months as the ideological and strategic backbone behind the eruption of skirmishes over science in school districts and state capitals across the country."; "Frequently Asked Questions About 'Intelligent Design'". American Civil Liberties Union. New York: American Civil Liberties Union. September 16, 2005. Who is behind the ID movement?.; Attie, et al. 2006, "The engine behind the ID movement is the Discovery Institute.") ID is a form of creationism that lacks empirical support and offers no testable or tenable hypotheses, and is therefore not science.

Although the phrase intelligent design had featured previously in theological discussions of the argument from design, its first publication in its present use as an alternative term for creationism was in Of Pandas and People, a 1989 creationist textbook intended for high school biology classes. In 1987, the Edwards v. Aguillard United States Supreme Court decision ruled that "creation science" is not science, and therefore a violation of the Establishment Clause if taught in public school biology classes. After the decision, all mentions of the term "creation science" in the textbook were directly replaced by "intelligent design", and mentions of the term "creation scientists" were replaced by "design proponents". From the mid-1990s onward, the intelligent design movement (IDM), supported by the Discovery Institute, advocated for the inclusion of intelligent design in public school biology curricula. This led to the 2005 Kitzmiller v. Dover Area School District trial, which ruled that intelligent design was not science, that it "cannot uncouple itself from its creationist, and thus religious, antecedents", and that the public school district's promotion of it therefore violated the Establishment Clause of the First Amendment to the United States Constitution.

ID seeks to challenge the methodological naturalism inherent in modern science. As a positive argument against evolution, ID proposes an analogy between natural systems and human artifacts, a version of the theological argument from design for the existence of God. (Note: Kitzmiller v. Dover Area School District, 04 cv 2688 (December 20, 2005). s:Kitzmiller v. Dover Area School District#E. Application of the Endorsement Test to the ID Policy pp. 24–25. "the argument for ID is not a new scientific argument, but is rather an old religious argument for the existence of God. He traced this argument back to at least Thomas Aquinas in the 13th century, who framed the argument as a syllogism: Wherever complex design exists, there must have been a designer; nature is complex; therefore nature must have had an intelligent designer. ......[T]his argument for the existence of God was advanced early in the 19th century by Reverend Paley... [the teleological argument] The only apparent difference between the argument made by Paley and the argument for ID, as expressed by defense expert witnesses Behe and Minnich, is that ID's 'official position' does not acknowledge that the designer is God.") ID proponents then conclude by analogy that the complex features, as defined by ID, are evidence of design. Critics of ID find a false dichotomy in the premise that evidence against evolution constitutes evidence for design.

== History ==
=== Origin of the concept ===
In 1910, evolution was not a topic of major religious controversy in America, but in the 1920s, the fundamentalist–modernist controversy in theology resulted in fundamentalist Christian opposition to teaching evolution and resulted in the origins of modern creationism. As a result, teaching of evolution was effectively suspended in US public schools until the 1960s, and when evolution was then reintroduced into the curriculum, there was a series of court cases in which attempts were made to get creationism taught alongside evolution in science classes. Young Earth creationists (YECs) promoted creation science as "an alternative scientific explanation of the world in which we live". This frequently invoked the argument from design to explain complexity in nature as supposedly demonstrating the existence of God.

The argument from design, also known as the teleological argument or "argument from intelligent design", has been presented by theologians for centuries. Thomas Aquinas presented this argument in his fifth proof of God's existence as a syllogism. In 1802, William Paley's Natural Theology presented examples of intricate purpose in organisms. His version of the watchmaker analogy argued that a watch has evidently been designed by a craftsman and that it is just as evident that the complexity and adaptation seen in nature must have been designed. He went on to argue that the perfection and diversity of these designs shows the designer to be omnipotent and that this can only be the Christian god. Like creation science, intelligent design centers on Paley's religious argument from design, but while Paley's natural theology was open to deistic design through God-given laws, intelligent design seeks scientific confirmation of repeated supposedly miraculous interventions in the history of life. Creation science prefigured the intelligent design arguments of irreducible complexity, even featuring the bacterial flagellum. In the United States, attempts to introduce creation science into schools led to court rulings that it is religious in nature and thus cannot be taught in public school science classrooms. Intelligent design is also presented as science and shares other arguments with creation science but avoids literal Biblical references to such topics as the biblical flood story or using Bible verses to estimate the age of the Earth.

Philosopher Barbara Forrest writes that the intelligent design movement began in 1984 with the book The Mystery of Life's Origin: Reassessing Current Theories, co-written by the creationist and chemist Charles B. Thaxton and two other authors and published by Jon A. Buell's Foundation for Thought and Ethics.

In March 1986, ID proponent Stephen C. Meyer published a review of this book, discussing how information theory could suggest that messages transmitted by DNA in the cell show "specified complexity" and must have been created by an intelligent agent. He also argued that science is based upon "foundational assumptions" of naturalism that were as much a matter of faith as those of "creation theory". In November of that year, Thaxton described his reasoning as a more sophisticated form of Paley's argument from design. At a conference that Thaxton held in 1988 ("Sources of Information Content in DNA"), he said that his intelligent cause view was compatible with both metaphysical naturalism and supernaturalism.

Intelligent design avoids identifying or naming the intelligent designer—it merely states that one (or more) must exist—but leaders of the movement have said the designer is the Christian God. (Note: Kitzmiller v. Dover Area School District, s:Kitzmiller v. Dover Area School District#E. Application of the Endorsement Test to the ID Policy, pages 26–27, "the writings of leading ID proponents reveal that the designer postulated by their argument is the God of Christianity." Examples include: Nickson, Elizabeth (February 6, 2004). "Let's Be Intelligent about Darwin". National Post (Reprint). Toronto: Postmedia Network. ISSN 1486-8008. Archived from the original on December 28, 2013. "Our strategy has been to change the subject a bit, so that we can get the issue of intelligent design, which really means the reality of God, before the academic world and into the schools." — Phillip E. Johnson (2003); Grelen, Jay (November 30, 1996). "Witnesses for the prosecution". World. Vol. 11, no. 28. Asheville, N.C.: God's World Publications. p. 18. ISSN 0888-157X. "This isn't really, and never has been, a debate about science. It's about religion and philosophy."; Johnson 2002, "So the question is: How to win? That's when I began to develop what you now see full-fledged in the 'wedge' strategy: 'Stick with the most important thing'—the mechanism and the building up of information. Get the Bible and the Book of Genesis out of the debate because you do not want to raise the so-called Bible-science dichotomy. Phrase the argument in such a way that you can get it heard in the secular academy and in a way that tends to unify the religious dissenters. That means concentrating on, 'Do you need a Creator to do the creating, or can nature do it on its own?' and refusing to get sidetracked onto other issues, which people are always trying to do.") (Note: Ted, Koppel (August 10, 2005). "Doubting Darwin: The Marketing of Intelligent Design". Nightline. New York. American Broadcasting Company. "I think the designer is God ..." — Stephen C. Meyer: Pearcey 2004, pp. 204–205, "By contrast, design theory demonstrates that Christians can sit in the supernaturalist's chair, even in their professional lives, seeing the cosmos through the lens of a comprehensive biblical worldview. Intelligent Design steps boldly into the scientific arena to build a case based on empirical data. It takes Christianity out of the ineffectual realm of value and stakes out a cognitive claim in the realm of objective truth. It restores Christianity to its status as genuine knowledge, equipping us to defend it in the public arena.") Whether this lack of specificity about the designer's identity in public discussions is a genuine feature of the concept – or just a posture taken to avoid alienating those who would separate religion from the teaching of science – has been a matter of great debate between supporters and critics of intelligent design. The Kitzmiller v. Dover Area School District court ruling held the latter to be the case.

=== Origin of the term ===
Since the Middle Ages, discussion of the religious "argument from design" or "teleological argument" in theology, with its concept of "intelligent design", has persistently referred to the theistic Creator God. Although ID proponents chose this provocative label for their proposed alternative to evolutionary explanations, they have de-emphasized their religious antecedents and denied that ID is natural theology, while still presenting ID as supporting the argument for the existence of God.

While intelligent design proponents have pointed out past examples of the phrase intelligent design that they said were not creationist and faith-based, they have failed to show that these usages had any influence on those who introduced the label in the intelligent design movement.

Variations on the phrase appeared in Young Earth creationist publications: a 1967 book co-written by Percival Davis referred to "design according to which basic organisms were created". In 1970, A. E. Wilder-Smith published The Creation of Life: A Cybernetic Approach to Evolution. The book defended Paley's design argument with computer calculations of the improbability of genetic sequences, which he said could not be explained by evolution but required "the abhorred necessity of divine intelligent activity behind nature", and that "the same problem would be expected to beset the relationship between the designer behind nature and the intelligently designed part of nature known as man." In a 1984 article as well as in his affidavit to Edwards v. Aguillard, Dean H. Kenyon defended creation science by stating that "biomolecular systems require intelligent design and engineering know-how", citing Wilder-Smith. Creationist Richard B. Bliss used the phrase "creative design" in Origins: Two Models: Evolution, Creation (1976), and in Origins: Creation or Evolution (1988) wrote that "while evolutionists are trying to find non-intelligent ways for life to occur, the creationist insists that an intelligent design must have been there in the first place."

==== Of Pandas and People ====
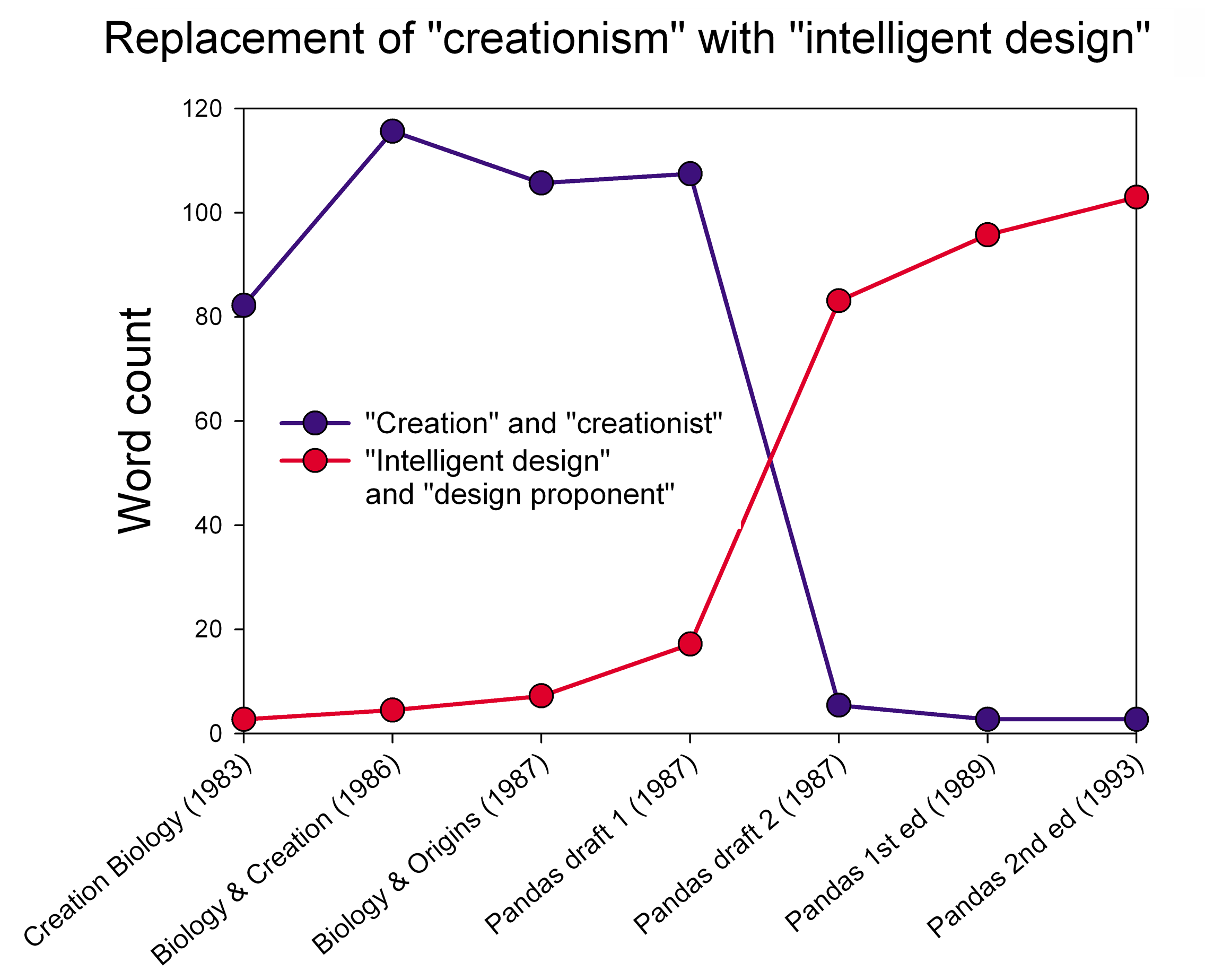
Use of the terms "creationism" versus "intelligent design" in sequential drafts of the 1989 book Of Pandas and People

The most common modern use of the words "intelligent design" as a term intended to describe a field of inquiry began after the United States Supreme Court ruled in June 1987 in the case of Edwards v. Aguillard that it is unconstitutional for a state to require the teaching of creationism in public school science curricula.

A Discovery Institute report says that Charles B. Thaxton, editor of Pandas, had picked the phrase up from a NASA scientist. In two successive 1987 drafts of the book, over one hundred uses of the root word "creation", such as "creationism" and "Creation Science", were changed, almost without exception, to "intelligent design", while "creationists" was changed to "design proponents" or, in one instance, "cdesign proponentsists" [sic]. In June 1988, Thaxton held a conference titled "Sources of Information Content in DNA" in Tacoma, Washington. Stephen C. Meyer was at the conference, and later recalled that "The term intelligent design came up..." In December 1988 Thaxton decided to use the label "intelligent design" for his new creationist movement.

Of Pandas and People was published in 1989, and in addition to including all the current arguments for ID, was the first book to make systematic use of the terms "intelligent design" and "design proponents" as well as the phrase "design theory", defining the term intelligent design in a glossary and representing it as not being creationism. It thus represents the start of the modern intelligent design movement. "Intelligent design" was the most prominent of around fifteen new terms it introduced as a new lexicon of creationist terminology to oppose evolution without using religious language. It was the first place where the phrase "intelligent design" appeared in its primary present use, as stated both by its publisher Jon A. Buell, and by William A. Dembski in his expert witness report for Kitzmiller v. Dover Area School District.

The National Center for Science Education (NCSE) has criticized the book for presenting all of the basic arguments of intelligent design proponents and being actively promoted for use in public schools before any research had been done to support these arguments. Although presented as a scientific textbook, philosopher of science Michael Ruse considers the contents "worthless and dishonest". An American Civil Liberties Union lawyer described it as a political tool aimed at students who did not "know science or understand the controversy over evolution and creationism". One of the authors of the science framework used by California schools, Kevin Padian, condemned it for its "sub-text", "intolerance for honest science" and "incompetence".

== Concepts ==
=== Irreducible complexity ===
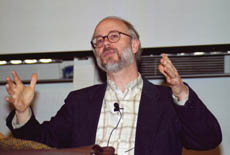
The concept of irreducible complexity was popularised by Michael Behe in his 1996 book, Darwin's Black Box.

The term "irreducible complexity" was introduced by biochemist Michael Behe in his 1996 book Darwin's Black Box, though he had already described the concept in his contributions to the 1993 revised edition of Of Pandas and People. Behe defines it as "a single system which is composed of several well-matched interacting parts that contribute to the basic function, wherein the removal of any one of the parts causes the system to effectively cease functioning".

Behe uses the analogy of a mousetrap to illustrate this concept. A mousetrap consists of several interacting pieces—the base, the catch, the spring and the hammer—all of which must be in place for the mousetrap to work. Removal of any one piece destroys the function of the mousetrap. Intelligent design advocates assert that natural selection could not create irreducibly complex systems, because the selectable function is present only when all parts are assembled. Behe argued that irreducibly complex biological mechanisms include the bacterial flagellum of E. coli, the blood clotting cascade, cilia, and the adaptive immune system.

Critics point out that the irreducible complexity argument assumes that the necessary parts of a system have always been necessary and therefore could not have been added sequentially. They argue that something that is at first merely advantageous can later become necessary as other components change. Furthermore, they argue, evolution often proceeds by altering preexisting parts or by removing them from a system, rather than by adding them. This is sometimes called the "scaffolding objection" by an analogy with scaffolding, which can support an "irreducibly complex" building until it is complete and able to stand on its own. (Note: Bridgham, Jamie T.; Carroll, Sean M.; Thornton, Joseph W. (April 7, 2006). "Evolution of Hormone-Receptor Complexity by Molecular Exploitation". Science. 312 (5770): 97–101. Bibcode:2006Sci...312...97B. doi:10.1126/science.1123348. PMID 16601189. S2CID 9662677. Bridgham, et al., showed that gradual evolutionary mechanisms can produce complex protein-protein interaction systems from simpler precursors.) In the case of Behe's mousetrap analogy, it has been shown that a mousetrap can be created with increasingly fewer parts and that even a single part is sufficient.

Behe has acknowledged using "sloppy prose", and that his "argument against Darwinism does not add up to a logical proof." (Note: Orr 2005. This article draws from the following exchange of letters in which Behe admits to sloppy prose and non-logical proof: Behe, Michael; Dembski, William A.; Wells, Jonathan; Nelson, Paul A.; Berlinski, David (March 26, 2003). "Has Darwin Met His Match? – Letters: An Exchange Over ID". Center for Science and Culture (Reprint). Seattle: Discovery Institute.) Irreducible complexity has remained a popular argument among advocates of intelligent design, but in the Dover trial the court took evidence that evolutionary explanations of supposed examples had already been published, and held that "Professor Behe's claim for irreducible complexity has been refuted in peer-reviewed research papers and has been rejected by the scientific community at large."

=== Specified complexity ===
In 1986, Charles B. Thaxton, a physical chemist and creationist, used the term "specified complexity" from information theory when claiming that messages transmitted by DNA in the cell were specified by intelligence, and must have originated with an intelligent agent. The intelligent design concept of "specified complexity" was developed in the 1990s by mathematician, philosopher, and theologian William A. Dembski. Dembski states that when something exhibits specified complexity (i.e., is both complex and "specified", simultaneously), one can infer that it was produced by an intelligent cause (i.e., that it was designed) rather than being the result of natural processes. He provides the following examples: "A single letter of the alphabet is specified without being complex. A long sentence of random letters is complex without being specified. A Shakespearean sonnet is both complex and specified." He states that details of living things can be similarly characterized, especially the "patterns" of molecular sequences in functional biological molecules such as DNA.

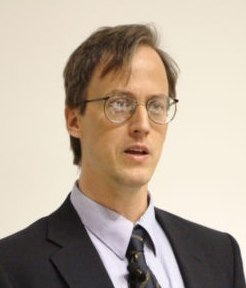
William A. Dembski proposed the concept of specified complexity.

Dembski defines complex specified information (CSI) as anything with a less than 1 in 10^{150} chance of occurring by (natural) chance. Critics say that this renders the argument a tautology: complex specified information cannot occur naturally because Dembski has defined it thus, so the real question becomes whether or not CSI actually exists in nature. (Note: Dembski, William A. (2001). "Another Way to Detect Design?". Metanexus. New York: Metanexus Institute. This is a "three part lecture series entitled 'Another Way to Detect Design' which contains William Dembski's response to Fitelson, Stephens, and Sober whose article 'How Not to Detect Design' ran on Metanexus:Views (2001.09.14, 2001.09.21, and 2001.09.28). These lectures were first made available online at Metanexus: The Online Forum on Religion and Science http://www.metanexus.net. This is from three keynote lectures delivered October 5–6, 2001 at the Society of Christian Philosopher's meeting at the University of Colorado, Boulder.")

The conceptual soundness of Dembski's specified complexity/CSI argument has been discredited in the scientific and mathematical communities. Specified complexity has yet to be shown to have wide applications in other fields, as Dembski asserts. John Wilkins and Wesley R. Elsberry characterize Dembski's "explanatory filter" as eliminative because it eliminates explanations sequentially: first regularity, then chance, finally defaulting to design. They argue that this procedure is flawed as a model for scientific inference because the asymmetric way it treats the different possible explanations renders it prone to making false conclusions.

Richard Dawkins, evolutionary biologist and religion critic, argues in The God Delusion (2006) that allowing for an intelligent designer to account for unlikely complexity only postpones the problem, as such a designer would need to be at least as complex. Other scientists have argued that evolution through selection is better able to explain the observed complexity, as is evident from the use of selective evolution to design certain electronic, aeronautic and automotive systems that are considered problems too complex for human "intelligent designers".

=== Fine-tuned universe ===
Intelligent design proponents have also occasionally appealed to broader teleological arguments outside of biology, most notably an argument based on the fine-tuning of universal constants that make matter and life possible and that are argued not to be solely attributable to chance. These include the values of fundamental physical constants, the relative strength of nuclear forces, electromagnetism, and gravity between fundamental particles, as well as the ratios of masses of such particles. Intelligent design proponent and Center for Science and Culture fellow Guillermo Gonzalez argues that if any of these values were even slightly different, the universe would be dramatically different, making it impossible for many chemical elements and features of the Universe, such as galaxies, to form. Thus, proponents argue, an intelligent designer of life was needed to ensure that the requisite features were present to achieve that particular outcome.

Scientists have generally responded that these arguments are poorly supported by existing evidence. Victor J. Stenger and other critics say both intelligent design and the weak form of the anthropic principle are essentially a tautology; in his view, these arguments amount to the claim that life is able to exist because the Universe is able to support life. The claim of the improbability of a life-supporting universe has also been criticized as an argument by lack of imagination for assuming no other forms of life are possible: life as we know it might not exist if things were different, but a different sort of life might exist in its place. A number of critics also suggest that many of the stated variables appear to be interconnected and that calculations made by mathematicians and physicists suggest that the emergence of a universe similar to ours is quite probable.

=== Intelligent designer ===
The contemporary intelligent design movement formulates its arguments in secular terms and intentionally avoids identifying the intelligent agent (or agents) they posit. Although they do not state that God is the designer, the designer is often implicitly hypothesized to have intervened in a way that only a god could intervene. Dembski, in The Design Inference (1998), speculates that an alien culture could fulfill these requirements. Of Pandas and People proposes that the search for extraterrestrial intelligence illustrates an appeal to intelligent design in science. In 2000, philosopher of science Robert T. Pennock suggested the Raëlian UFO religion as a real-life example of an extraterrestrial intelligent designer view that "make[s] many of the same bad arguments against evolutionary theory as creationists".

Beyond the debate over whether intelligent design is scientific, a number of critics argue that existing evidence makes the design hypothesis appear unlikely, irrespective of its status in the world of science. For example, Jerry Coyne asks why a designer would "give us a pathway for making vitamin C, but then destroy it by disabling one of its enzymes" (see pseudogene) and why a designer would not "stock oceanic islands with reptiles, mammals, amphibians, and freshwater fish, despite the suitability of such islands for these species". Coyne also points to the fact that "the flora and fauna on those islands resemble that of the nearest mainland, even when the environments are very different" as evidence that species were not placed there by a designer. Previously, in Darwin's Black Box, Behe had argued that we are simply incapable of understanding the designer's motives, so such questions cannot be answered definitively. Odd designs could, for example, "...have been placed there by the designer for a reason—for artistic reasons, for variety, to show off, for some as-yet-undetected practical purpose, or for some unguessable reason—or they might not." Coyne responds that in light of the evidence, "either life resulted not from intelligent design, but from evolution; or the intelligent designer is a cosmic prankster who designed everything to make it look as though it had evolved."

Intelligent design proponents such as Paul Nelson avoid the problem of poor design in nature by insisting that we have simply failed to understand the perfection of the design. Behe cites Paley as his inspiration, but he differs from Paley's expectation of a perfect Creation and proposes that designers do not necessarily produce the best design they can. Behe suggests that, like a parent not wanting to spoil a child with extravagant toys, the designer can have multiple motives for not giving priority to excellence in engineering. He says that "Another problem with the argument from imperfection is that it critically depends on a psychoanalysis of the unidentified designer. Yet the reasons that a designer would or would not do anything are virtually impossible to know unless the designer tells you specifically what those reasons are." This reliance on inexplicable motives of the designer makes intelligent design scientifically untestable. Retired UC Berkeley law professor, author and intelligent design advocate Phillip E. Johnson puts forward a core definition that the designer creates for a purpose, giving the example that in his view AIDS was created to punish immorality and is not caused by HIV, but such motives cannot be tested by scientific methods.

Asserting the need for a designer of complexity also raises the question "What designed the designer?" Intelligent design proponents say that the question is irrelevant to or outside the scope of intelligent design. Richard Wein counters that "...scientific explanations often create new unanswered questions. But, in assessing the value of an explanation, these questions are not irrelevant. They must be balanced against the improvements in our understanding which the explanation provides. Invoking an unexplained being to explain the origin of other beings (ourselves) is little more than question-begging. The new question raised by the explanation is as problematic as the question which the explanation purports to answer." Richard Dawkins sees the assertion that the designer does not need to be explained as a thought-terminating cliché. In the absence of observable, measurable evidence, the question "What designed the designer?" leads to an infinite regression from which intelligent design proponents can only escape by resorting to religious creationism or logical contradiction.

== Movement ==
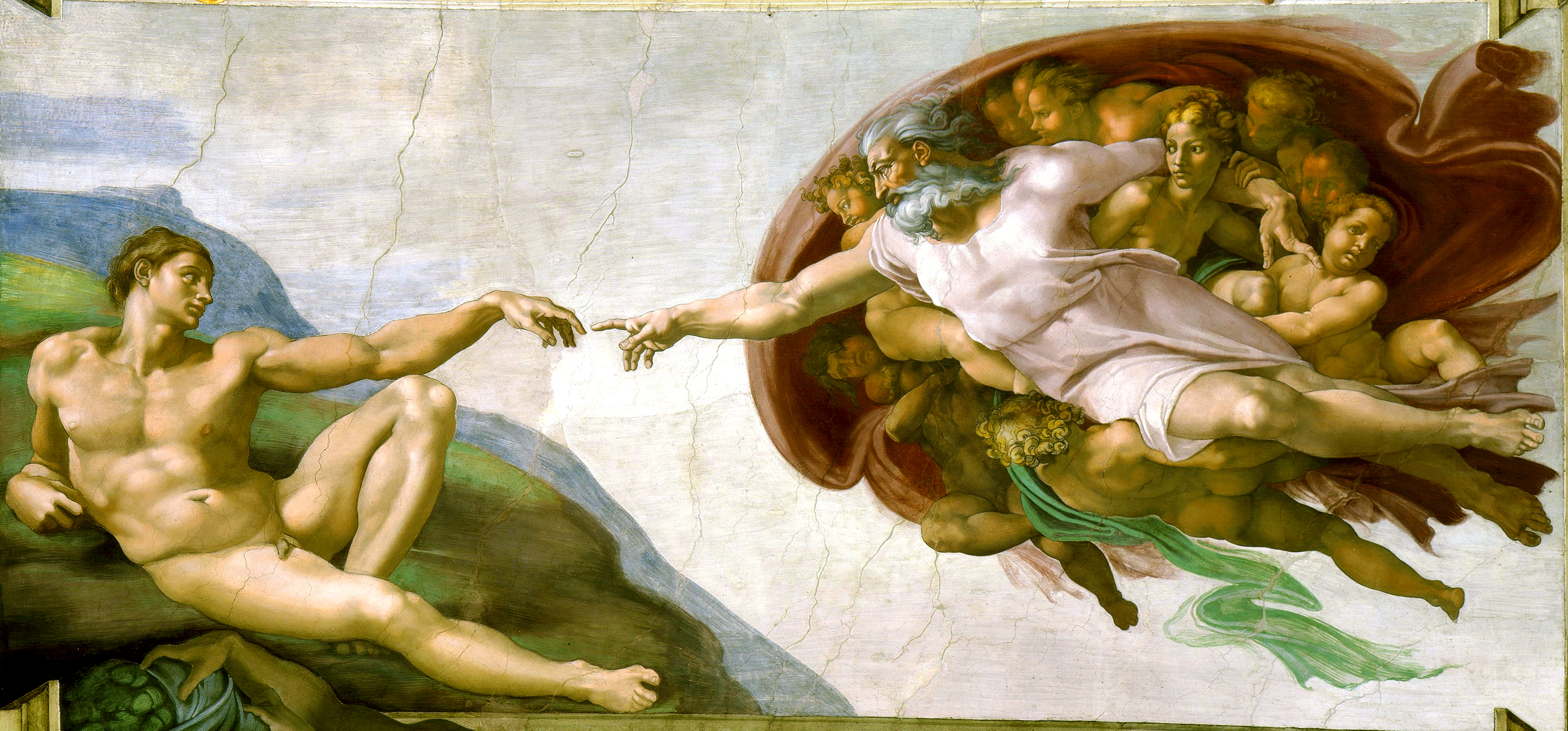
The Discovery Institute's Center for the Renewal of Science and Culture used banners based on The Creation of Adam from the Sistine Chapel. Later it used a less religious image, then was renamed the Center for Science and Culture.

The intelligent design movement is a direct outgrowth of the creationism of the 1980s. The scientific and academic communities, along with a US federal court, view intelligent design as either a form of creationism or as a direct descendant that is closely intertwined with traditional creationism; and several authors explicitly refer to it as "intelligent design creationism". (Note: Pennock 2001, "Wizards of ID: Reply to Dembski", pp. 645–667, "Dembski chides me for never using the term 'intelligent design' without conjoining it to 'creationism'. He implies (though never explicitly asserts) that he and others in his movement are not creationists and that it is incorrect to discuss them in such terms, suggesting that doing so is merely a rhetorical ploy to 'rally the troops'. (2) Am I (and the many others who see Dembski's movement in the same way) misrepresenting their position? The basic notion of creationism is the rejection of biological evolution in favor of special creation, where the latter is understood to be supernatural. Beyond this there is considerable variability...")

The movement is headquartered in the Center for Science and Culture, established in 1996 as the creationist wing of the Discovery Institute to promote a religious agenda calling for broad social, academic and political changes. The Discovery Institute's intelligent design campaigns have been staged primarily in the United States, although efforts have been made in other countries to promote intelligent design. Leaders of the movement say intelligent design exposes the limitations of scientific orthodoxy and of the secular philosophy of naturalism. Intelligent design proponents allege that science should not be limited to naturalism and should not demand the adoption of a naturalistic philosophy that dismisses out-of-hand any explanation that includes a supernatural cause. The overall goal of the movement is to "reverse the stifling dominance of the materialist worldview" represented by the theory of evolution in favor of "a science consonant with Christian and theistic convictions".

Phillip E. Johnson stated that the goal of intelligent design is to cast creationism as a scientific concept. (Note: Johnson, Phillip E. "How The Evolution Debate Can Be Won". Coral Ridge Ministries. Fort Lauderdale, Fla.: Coral Ridge Ministries. Archived from the original on November 7, 2007. "I have built an intellectual movement in the universities and churches that we call The Wedge, which is devoted to scholarship and writing that furthers this program of questioning the materialistic basis of science. ... Now the way that I see the logic of our movement going is like this. The first thing you understand is that the Darwinian theory isn't true. It's falsified by all of the evidence and the logic is terrible. When you realize that, the next question that occurs to you is, well, where might you get the truth? ... I start with John 1:1. In the beginning was the word. In the beginning was intelligence, purpose, and wisdom. The Bible had that right. And the materialist scientists are deluding themselves." — Johnson, "Reclaiming America for Christ Conference" (1999)) All leading intelligent design proponents are fellows or staff of the Discovery Institute and its Center for Science and Culture. Nearly all intelligent design concepts and the associated movement are the products of the Discovery Institute, which guides the movement and follows its wedge strategy while conducting its "teach the controversy" campaign and their other related programs.

Leading intelligent design proponents have made conflicting statements regarding intelligent design. In statements directed at the general public, they say intelligent design is not religious; when addressing conservative Christian supporters, they state that intelligent design has its foundation in the Bible. Recognizing the need for support, the Institute affirms its Christian, evangelistic orientation:

Alongside a focus on influential opinion-makers, we also seek to build up a popular base of support among our natural constituency, namely, Christians. We will do this primarily through apologetics seminars. We intend these to encourage and equip believers with new scientific evidences that support the faith, as well as to "popularize" our ideas in the broader culture.

Barbara Forrest, an expert who has written extensively on the movement, describes this as being due to the Discovery Institute's obfuscating its agenda as a matter of policy. She has written that the movement's "activities betray an aggressive, systematic agenda for promoting not only intelligent design creationism, but the religious worldview that undergirds it."

=== Religion and leading proponents ===
Although arguments for intelligent design by the intelligent design movement are formulated in secular terms and intentionally avoid positing the identity of the designer, the majority of principal intelligent design advocates are publicly religious Christians who have stated that, in their view, the designer proposed in intelligent design is the Christian conception of God. Stuart Burgess, Phillip E. Johnson, William A. Dembski, and Stephen C. Meyer are evangelical Protestants; Michael Behe is a Roman Catholic; Paul Nelson supports young Earth creationism; and Jonathan Wells is a member of the Unification Church. Non-Christian proponents include David Klinghoffer, who is Jewish, Michael Denton and David Berlinski, who are agnostic, and Muzaffar Iqbal, a Pakistani-Canadian Muslim. Phillip E. Johnson has stated that cultivating ambiguity by employing secular language in arguments that are carefully crafted to avoid overtones of theistic creationism is a necessary first step for ultimately reintroducing the Christian concept of God as the designer. Johnson explicitly calls for intelligent design proponents to obfuscate their religious motivations so as to avoid having intelligent design identified "as just another way of packaging the Christian evangelical message." Johnson emphasizes that "...the first thing that has to be done is to get the Bible out of the discussion. ...This is not to say that the biblical issues are unimportant; the point is rather that the time to address them will be after we have separated materialist prejudice from scientific fact."

The strategy of deliberately disguising the religious intent of intelligent design has been described by William A. Dembski in The Design Inference. In this work, Dembski lists a god or an "alien life force" as two possible options for the identity of the designer; however, in his book Intelligent Design: The Bridge Between Science and Theology (1999), Dembski states:

Christ is indispensable to any scientific theory, even if its practitioners don't have a clue about him. The pragmatics of a scientific theory can, to be sure, be pursued without recourse to Christ. But the conceptual soundness of the theory can in the end only be located in Christ.

Dembski also stated, "ID is part of God's general revelation ... Not only does intelligent design rid us of this ideology [materialism], which suffocates the human spirit, but, in my personal experience, I've found that it opens the path for people to come to Christ." Both Johnson and Dembski cite the Bible's Gospel of John as the foundation of intelligent design.

Barbara Forrest contends such statements reveal that leading proponents see intelligent design as essentially religious in nature, not merely a scientific concept that has implications with which their personal religious beliefs happen to coincide. (Note: "Kitzmiller v. Dover Area School District Trial transcript: Day 6 (October 5), PM Session, Part 2". TalkOrigins Archive. Houston: The TalkOrigins Foundation, Inc. "What I am talking about is the essence of intelligent design, and the essence of it is theistic realism as defined by Professor Johnson. Now that stands on its own quite apart from what their motives are. I'm also talking about the definition of intelligent design by Dr. Dembski as the Logos theology of John's Gospel. That stands on its own. ... Intelligent design, as it is understood by the proponents that we are discussing today, does involve a supernatural creator, and that is my objection. And I am objecting to it as they have defined it, as Professor Johnson has defined intelligent design, and as Dr. Dembski has defined intelligent design. And both of those are basically religious. They involve the supernatural." — Barbara Forrest, 2005, testifying in the Kitzmiller v. Dover Area School District trial.) She writes that the leading proponents of intelligent design are closely allied with the ultra-conservative Christian Reconstructionism movement. She lists connections of (current and former) Discovery Institute Fellows Phillip E. Johnson, Charles B. Thaxton, Michael Behe, Richard Weikart, Jonathan Wells and Francis J. Beckwith to leading Christian Reconstructionist organizations, and the extent of the funding provided the Institute by Howard Ahmanson, Jr., a leading figure in the Reconstructionist movement.

=== Reaction from other creationist groups ===
Not all creationist organizations have embraced the intelligent design movement. According to Thomas Dixon, "Religious leaders have come out against ID too. An open letter affirming the compatibility of Christian faith and the teaching of evolution, first produced in response to controversies in Wisconsin in 2004, has now been signed by over ten thousand clergy from different Christian denominations across America." Hugh Ross of Reasons to Believe, a proponent of Old Earth creationism, believes that the efforts of intelligent design proponents to divorce the concept from Biblical Christianity make its hypothesis too vague. In 2002, he wrote: "Winning the argument for design without identifying the designer yields, at best, a sketchy origins model. Such a model makes little if any positive impact on the community of scientists and other scholars. ... the time is right for a direct approach, a single leap into the origins fray. Introducing a biblically based, scientifically verifiable creation model represents such a leap."

Likewise, two of the most prominent YEC organizations in the world have attempted to distinguish their views from those of the intelligent design movement. Henry M. Morris of the Institute for Creation Research (ICR) wrote, in 1999, that ID, "even if well-meaning and effectively articulated, will not work! It has often been tried in the past and has failed, and it will fail today. The reason it won't work is because it is not the Biblical method." According to Morris: "The evidence of intelligent design ... must be either followed by or accompanied by a sound presentation of true Biblical creationism if it is to be meaningful and lasting." In 2002, Carl Wieland, then of Answers in Genesis (AiG), criticized design advocates who, though well-intentioned, "'left the Bible out of it'" and thereby unwittingly aided and abetted the modern rejection of the Bible. Wieland explained that "AiG's major 'strategy' is to boldly, but humbly, call the church back to its Biblical foundations ... [so] we neither count ourselves a part of this movement nor campaign against it."

=== Reaction from the scientific community ===
The unequivocal consensus in the scientific community is that intelligent design is not science and has no place in a science curriculum.

- The American Association for the Advancement of Science (AAAS), the largest association of scientists in the US, has 120,000 members, and firmly rejects ID.
- More than 70,000 Australian scientists "...urge all Australian governments and educators not to permit the teaching or promulgation of ID as science."
- National Center for Science Education: List of statements from scientific professional organizations on the status intelligent design and other forms of creationism in the sciences.
- Nature Methods 2007, "Long considered a North American phenomenon, pro-ID interest groups can also be found throughout Europe. ...Concern about this trend is now so widespread in Europe that in October 2007 the Council of Europe voted on a motion calling upon member states to firmly oppose the teaching of creationism as a scientific discipline."
- Dean 2007, "There is no credible scientific challenge to the theory of evolution as an explanation for the complexity and diversity of life on earth." The US National Academy of Sciences has stated that "creationism, intelligent design, and other claims of supernatural intervention in the origin of life or of species are not science because they are not testable by the methods of science." The US National Science Teachers Association and the American Association for the Advancement of Science have termed it pseudoscience. Others in the scientific community have denounced its tactics, accusing the ID movement of manufacturing false attacks against evolution, of engaging in misinformation and misrepresentation about science, and marginalizing those who teach it. More recently, in September 2012, Bill Nye warned that creationist views threaten science education and innovations in the United States.

In 2001, the Discovery Institute published advertisements under the heading "A Scientific Dissent From Darwinism", with the claim that listed scientists had signed this statement expressing skepticism:

We are skeptical of claims for the ability of random mutation and natural selection to account for the complexity of life. Careful examination of the evidence for Darwinian theory should be encouraged.

The ambiguous statement did not exclude other known evolutionary mechanisms, and most signatories were not scientists in relevant fields, but starting in 2004 the Institute claimed the increasing number of signatures indicated mounting doubts about evolution among scientists. The statement formed a key component of Discovery Institute campaigns to present intelligent design as scientifically valid by claiming that evolution lacks broad scientific support, with Institute members continuing to cite the list through at least 2011. As part of a strategy to counter these claims, scientists organised Project Steve, which gained more signatories named Steve (or variants) than the Institute's petition, and a counter-petition, "A Scientific Support for Darwinism", which quickly gained similar numbers of signatories.

=== Polls ===
Several surveys were conducted prior to the December 2005 decision in Kitzmiller v. Dover School District, which sought to determine the level of support for intelligent design among certain groups. According to a 2005 Harris poll, 10% of adults in the United States viewed human beings as "so complex that they required a powerful force or intelligent being to help create them." Although Zogby polls commissioned by the Discovery Institute show more support, these polls suffer from considerable flaws, such as having a low response rate (248 out of 16,000), being conducted on behalf of an organization with an expressed interest in the outcome of the poll, and containing leading questions.

A series of Gallup polls in the United States from 1982 through 2014 on "Evolution, Creationism, Intelligent Design" found support for "human beings have developed over millions of years from less advanced forms of life, but God guided the process" of between 31% and 40%, support for "God created human beings in pretty much their present form at one time within the last 10,000 years or so" varied from 40% to 47%, and support for "human beings have developed over millions of years from less advanced forms of life, but God had no part in the process" varied from 9% to 19%. The polls also noted answers to a series of more detailed questions. The 2017 Gallup creationism survey found that 38% of adults in the United States hold the view that "God created humans in their present form at one time within the last 10,000 years" when asked for their views on the origin and development of human beings, which was noted as being at the lowest level in 35 years.

=== Allegations of discrimination against ID proponents ===
There have been allegations that ID proponents have met discrimination, such as being refused tenure or being harshly criticized on the Internet. In the documentary film Expelled: No Intelligence Allowed, released in 2008, host Ben Stein presents five such cases. The film contends that the mainstream science establishment, in a "scientific conspiracy to keep God out of the nation's laboratories and classrooms", suppresses academics who believe they see evidence of intelligent design in nature or criticize evidence of evolution. Investigation into these allegations turned up alternative explanations for perceived persecution.

The film portrays intelligent design as motivated by science, rather than religion, though it does not give a detailed definition of the phrase or attempt to explain it on a scientific level. Other than briefly addressing issues of irreducible complexity, Expelled examines it as a political issue. The scientific theory of evolution is portrayed by the film as contributing to fascism, the Holocaust, communism, atheism, and eugenics.

Expelled has been used in private screenings to legislators as part of the Discovery Institute intelligent design campaign for Academic Freedom bills. Review screenings were restricted to churches and Christian groups, and at a special pre-release showing, one of the interviewees, PZ Myers, was refused admission. The American Association for the Advancement of Science describes the film as dishonest and divisive propaganda aimed at introducing religious ideas into public school science classrooms, and the Anti-Defamation League has denounced the film's allegation that evolutionary theory influenced the Holocaust. The film includes interviews with scientists and academics who were misled into taking part by misrepresentation of the topic and title of the film. Skeptic Michael Shermer describes his experience of being repeatedly asked the same question without context as "surreal".

== Criticism ==
=== Scientific criticism ===
Typical objections to defining intelligent design as science are that it lacks consistency, violates the principle of parsimony, (Note: See, e.g., Fitelson, Stephens & Sober 2001, "How Not to Detect Design–Critical Notice: William A. Dembski The Design Inference", pp. 597–616. Intelligent design fails to pass Occam's razor. Adding entities (an intelligent agent, a designer) to the equation is not strictly necessary to explain events.) is not scientifically useful, (Note: See, e.g., Schneider, Jill E. "Professor Schneider's thoughts on Evolution and Intelligent Design". Department of Biological Sciences. Bethlehem, Pa.: Lehigh University. Archived from the original on September 2, 2006. "Q: Why couldn't intelligent design also be a scientific theory? A: The idea of intelligent design might or might not be true, but when presented as a scientific hypothesis, it is not useful because it is based on weak assumptions, lacks supporting data and terminates further thought.") is not falsifiable, (Note: See, e.g., Kitzmiller v. Dover Area School District, cv 2688 (December 20, 2005). s:Kitzmiller v. Dover Area School District#E. Application of the Endorsement Test to the ID Policy, p. 22 and s:Kitzmiller v. Dover Area School District#4. Whether ID is Science, p. 77. The designer is not falsifiable, since its existence is typically asserted without sufficient conditions to allow a falsifying observation. The designer being beyond the realm of the observable, claims about its existence can be neither supported nor undermined by observation, making intelligent design and the argument from design analytic a posteriori arguments.) is not empirically testable, (Note: See, e.g., Kitzmiller v. Dover Area School District, cv 2688 (December 20, 2005). s:Kitzmiller v. Dover Area School District#E. Application of the Endorsement Test to the ID Policy, p. 22 and s:Kitzmiller v. Dover Area School District#4. Whether ID is Science, p. 66. That intelligent design is not empirically testable stems from the fact that it violates a basic premise of science, naturalism.) and is not correctable, dynamic, progressive, or provisional. (Note: See, e.g., the brief explanation in Kitzmiller v. Dover Area School District, 04 cv 2688 (December 20, 2005). s:Kitzmiller v. Dover Area School District#4. Whether ID is Science, p. 66. Intelligent design professes to offer an answer that does not need to be defined or explained, the intelligent agent, designer. By asserting a conclusion that cannot be accounted for scientifically, the designer, intelligent design cannot be sustained by any further explanation, and objections raised to those who accept intelligent design make little headway. Thus intelligent design is not a provisional assessment of data, which can change when new information is discovered. Once it is claimed that a conclusion that need not be accounted for has been established, there is simply no possibility of future correction. The idea of the progressive growth of scientific ideas is required to explain previous data and any previously unexplainable data.) (Note: "Nobel Laureates Initiative" (PDF) (Letter). The Elie Wiesel Foundation for Humanity. September 9, 2005. Archived from the original (PDF) on October 7, 2005. The September 2005 statement by 38 Nobel laureates stated that: "...intelligent design is fundamentally unscientific; it cannot be tested as scientific theory because its central conclusion is based on belief in the intervention of a supernatural agent.") (Note: "Intelligent Design is not Science: Scientists and teachers speak out". Faculty of Science. Sydney: University of New South Wales. October 2005. Archived from the original on June 14, 2006. The October 2005 statement, by a coalition representing more than 70,000 Australian scientists and science teachers said: "intelligent design is not science" and "urge all Australian governments and educators not to permit the teaching or promulgation of ID as science.")

For a theory to qualify as scientific, (Note: Gauch 2003, Chapters 5–8. Discusses principles of induction, deduction and probability related to the expectation of consistency, testability, and multiple observations. Chapter 8 discusses parsimony (Occam's razor).) (Note: Kitzmiller v. Dover Area School District, cv 2688 (December 20, 2005). s:Kitzmiller v. Dover Area School District#4. Whether ID is Science, p. 64. The ruling discusses central aspects of expectations in the scientific community that a scientific theory be testable, dynamic, correctible, progressive, based upon multiple observations, and provisional.) it is expected to be:

- Consistent
- Parsimonious (sparing in its proposed entities or explanations; see Occam's razor)
- Useful (describes and explains observed phenomena, and can be used in a predictive manner)
- Empirically testable and falsifiable (potentially confirmable or disprovable by experiment or observation)
- Based on multiple observations (often in the form of controlled, repeated experiments)
- Correctable and dynamic (modified in the light of observations that do not support it)
- Progressive (refines previous theories)
- Provisional or tentative (is open to experimental checking, and does not assert certainty)

For any theory, hypothesis, or conjecture to be considered scientific, it must meet most, and ideally all, of these criteria. The fewer criteria are met, the less scientific it is; if it meets only a few or none at all, then it cannot be treated as scientific in any meaningful sense of the word.

Advocates of intelligent design seek to keep God and the Bible out of the discussion, and present intelligent design in the language of science as though it were a scientific hypothesis; however, the failure to follow the procedures of scientific discourse and the failure to submit work to the scientific community that withstands scrutiny have weighed against intelligent design being accepted as valid science.

Some intelligent design proponents seek to change this fundamental basis of science by eliminating "methodological naturalism" from science and replacing it with what the leader of the intelligent design movement, Phillip E. Johnson, calls "theistic realism". (Note: Johnson 1996b, "My colleagues and I speak of 'theistic realism'—or sometimes, 'mere creation'—as the defining concept of our [the ID] movement. This means that we affirm that God is objectively real as Creator, and that the reality of God is tangibly recorded in evidence accessible to science, particularly in biology.")

Intelligent design proponents argue that naturalistic explanations fail to explain certain phenomena and that supernatural explanations provide a simple and intuitive explanation for the origins of life and the universe. (Note: Watanabe, Teresa (March 25, 2001). "Enlisting Science to Find the Fingerprints of a Creator". Los Angeles Times. "'We are taking an intuition most people have and making it a scientific and academic enterprise. ...'We are removing the most important cultural roadblock to accepting the role of God as creator.'" — Phillip E. Johnson) Many intelligent design followers believe that "scientism" is itself a religion that promotes secularism and materialism in an attempt to erase theism from public life, and they view their work in the promotion of intelligent design as a way to return religion to a central role in education and other public spheres.

It has been argued that methodological naturalism is not an assumption of science, but a result of science well done: the God explanation is the least parsimonious, so according to Occam's razor, it cannot be a scientific explanation.

Further criticism stems from the fact that the phrase intelligent design makes use of an assumption of the quality of an observable intelligence, a concept that has no scientific consensus definition. The characteristics of intelligence are assumed by intelligent design proponents to be observable without specifying what the criteria for the measurement of intelligence should be. Critics say that the design detection methods proposed by intelligent design proponents are radically different from conventional design detection, undermining the key elements that make it possible as legitimate science. Intelligent design proponents, they say, are proposing both searching for a designer without knowing anything about that designer's abilities, parameters, or intentions (which scientists do know when searching for the results of human intelligence), as well as denying the distinction between natural/artificial design that allows scientists to compare complex designed artifacts against the background of the sorts of complexity found in nature. (Note: Kitzmiller v. Dover Area School District, cv 2688 (December 20, 2005). s:Kitzmiller v. Dover Area School District#4. Whether ID is Science, p. 81. "For human artifacts, we know the designer's identity, human, and the mechanism of design, as we have experience based upon empirical evidence that humans can make such things, as well as many other attributes including the designer's abilities, needs, and desires. With ID, proponents assert that they refuse to propose hypotheses on the designer's identity, do not propose a mechanism, and the designer, he/she/it/they, has never been seen. In that vein, defense expert Professor Minnich agreed that in the case of human artifacts and objects, we know the identity and capacities of the human designer, but we do not know any of those attributes for the designer of biological life. In addition, Professor Behe agreed that for the design of human artifacts, we know the designer and its attributes and we have a baseline for human design that does not exist for design of biological systems. Professor Behe's only response to these seemingly insurmountable points of disanalogy was that the inference still works in science fiction movies.")

Among a significant proportion of the general public in the United States, the major concern is whether conventional evolutionary biology is compatible with belief in God and in the Bible, and how this issue is taught in schools. The Discovery Institute's "teach the controversy" campaign promotes intelligent design while attempting to discredit evolution in United States public high school science courses. The scientific community and science education organizations have replied that there is no scientific controversy regarding the validity of evolution and that the controversy exists solely in terms of religion and politics.

The intelligent design movement has not published a properly peer-reviewed article supporting ID in a scientific journal, and has failed to publish supporting peer-reviewed research or data. The only article published in a peer-reviewed scientific journal that made a case for intelligent design was quickly withdrawn by the publisher for having circumvented the journal's peer-review standards. The Discovery Institute says that a number of intelligent design articles have been published in peer-reviewed journals, but critics, largely members of the scientific community, reject this claim and state intelligent design proponents have set up their own journals with peer review that lack impartiality and rigor, consisting entirely of intelligent design supporters.

=== Arguments from ignorance ===
Eugenie C. Scott, along with Glenn Branch and other critics, has argued that many points raised by intelligent design proponents are arguments from ignorance. In the argument from ignorance, a lack of evidence for one view is erroneously argued to constitute proof of the correctness of another view. Scott and Branch say that intelligent design is an argument from ignorance because it relies on a lack of knowledge for its conclusion: lacking a natural explanation for certain specific aspects of evolution, we assume intelligent cause. They contend most scientists would reply that the unexplained is not unexplainable, and that "we don't know yet" is a more appropriate response than invoking a cause outside science. Particularly, Michael Behe's demands for ever more detailed explanations of the historical evolution of molecular systems seem to assume a false dichotomy, where either evolution or design is the proper explanation, and any perceived failure of evolution becomes a victory for design. Scott and Branch also contend that the supposedly novel contributions proposed by intelligent design proponents have not served as the basis for any productive scientific research.

Moreover, philosophical criticism of intelligent design has extended beyond traditional demarcation arguments that attempt to distinguish science from non-science. Some philosophers have argued that intelligent design faces a more fundamental problem of intelligibility when presented as a non-theological doctrine. According to this view, intelligent design cannot be coherently characterized without theological commitments, making it conceptually incoherent rather than merely unscientific. This philosophical position suggests that demarcation criteria—which have themselves been subject to philosophical controversy—are unnecessary for rejecting intelligent design, as the doctrine fails to achieve logical coherence when stripped of its theological foundations. Critics argue this approach provides a more robust philosophical foundation for dismissing intelligent design without relying on potentially contested boundaries between scientific and non-scientific inquiry.

In his conclusion to the Kitzmiller trial, Judge John E. Jones III wrote that "ID is at bottom premised upon a false dichotomy, namely, that to the extent evolutionary theory is discredited, ID is confirmed." This same argument had been put forward to support creation science at the McLean v. Arkansas (1982) trial, which found it was "contrived dualism", the false premise of a "two model approach". Behe's argument of irreducible complexity puts forward negative arguments against evolution but does not make any positive scientific case for intelligent design. It fails to allow for scientific explanations continuing to be found, as has been the case with several examples previously put forward as supposed cases of irreducible complexity.

=== Theological criticism ===
Intelligent design proponents often insist that their claims do not require a religious component. However, various philosophical and theological issues are naturally raised by the claims of intelligent design.

Intelligent design proponents attempt to demonstrate scientifically that features such as irreducible complexity and specified complexity could not arise through natural processes, and therefore required repeated direct miraculous interventions by a Designer (often a Christian concept of God). They reject the possibility of a Designer who works merely through setting natural laws in motion at the outset, in contrast to theistic evolution (to which even Charles Darwin was open). Intelligent design is distinct because it asserts repeated miraculous interventions in addition to designed laws. This contrasts with other major religious traditions of a created world in which God's interactions and influences do not work in the same way as physical causes. The Roman Catholic tradition makes a careful distinction between ultimate metaphysical explanations and secondary, natural causes.

The concept of direct miraculous intervention raises other potential theological implications. If such a Designer does not intervene to alleviate suffering even though capable of intervening for other reasons, some imply the designer is not omnibenevolent (see problem of evil and related theodicy).

Further, repeated interventions imply that the original design was not perfect and final, and thus pose a problem for any who believe that the Creator's work had been both perfect and final. Intelligent design proponents seek to explain the problem of poor design in nature by insisting that we have simply failed to understand the perfection of the design (for example, proposing that vestigial organs have unknown purposes), or by proposing that designers do not necessarily produce the best design they can, and may have unknowable motives for their actions.

In 2005, the director of the Vatican Observatory, the Jesuit astronomer George Coyne, set out theological reasons for accepting evolution in an August 2005 article in The Tablet, and said that "Intelligent design isn't science even though it pretends to be. If you want to teach it in schools, intelligent design should be taught when religion or cultural history is taught, not science." In 2006, he "condemned ID as a kind of 'crude creationism' which reduced God to a mere engineer."

Critics state that the wedge strategy's "ultimate goal is to create a theocratic state". The Discovery Institute rejected the charge. Others have said that the charge is overstated, but accurate. Nevertheless, intelligent design seems to cross the boundary between church and state.

=== God of the gaps ===
Intelligent design has also been characterized as a God-of-the-gaps argument, which has the following form:

- There is a gap in scientific knowledge.
- The gap is filled with acts of God (or intelligent designer) and therefore proves the existence of God (or intelligent designer).

A God-of-the-gaps argument is the theological version of an argument from ignorance. A key feature of this type of argument is that it merely answers outstanding questions with explanations (often supernatural) that are unverifiable and ultimately themselves subject to unanswerable questions. Historians of science observe that the astronomy of the earliest civilizations, although astonishing and incorporating mathematical constructions far in excess of any practical value, proved to be misdirected and of little importance to the development of science because they failed to inquire more carefully into the mechanisms that drove the heavenly bodies across the sky. It was the Greek civilization that first practiced science, although not yet as a formally defined experimental science, but nevertheless an attempt to rationalize the world of natural experience without recourse to divine intervention. In this historically motivated definition of science any appeal to an intelligent creator is explicitly excluded for the paralysing effect it may have on scientific progress.

== Legal challenges in the United States ==
=== Kitzmiller trial ===
Kitzmiller v. Dover Area School District was the first direct challenge brought in the United States federal courts against a public school district that required the presentation of intelligent design as an alternative to evolution. The plaintiffs successfully argued that intelligent design is a form of creationism, and that the school board policy thus violated the Establishment Clause of the First Amendment to the United States Constitution.

Eleven parents of students in Dover, Pennsylvania, sued the Dover Area School District over a statement that the school board required be read aloud in ninth-grade science classes when evolution was taught. The plaintiffs were represented by the American Civil Liberties Union (ACLU), Americans United for Separation of Church and State (AU) and Pepper Hamilton LLP. The National Center for Science Education acted as consultants for the plaintiffs. The defendants were represented by the Thomas More Law Center. The suit was tried in a bench trial from September 26 to November 4, 2005, before Judge John E. Jones III. Kenneth R. Miller, Kevin Padian, Brian Alters, Robert T. Pennock, Barbara Forrest and John F. Haught served as expert witnesses for the plaintiffs. Michael Behe, Steve Fuller and Scott Minnich served as expert witnesses for the defense.

On December 20, 2005, Judge Jones issued his 139-page findings of fact and decision, ruling that the Dover mandate was unconstitutional, and barring intelligent design from being taught in Pennsylvania's Middle District public school science classrooms. On November 8, 2005, there had been an election in which the eight Dover school board members who voted for the intelligent design requirement were all defeated by challengers who opposed the teaching of intelligent design in a science class, and the current school board president stated that the board did not intend to appeal the ruling.

In his finding of facts, Judge Jones made the following condemnation of the "Teach the Controversy" strategy:

Moreover, ID's backers have sought to avoid the scientific scrutiny which we have now determined that it cannot withstand by advocating that the controversy, but not ID itself, should be taught in science class. This tactic is at best disingenuous, and at worst a canard. The goal of the IDM is not to encourage critical thought, but to foment a revolution which would supplant evolutionary theory with ID.

=== Reaction to Kitzmiller ruling ===
Judge Jones himself anticipated that his ruling would be criticized, saying in his decision that:

Those who disagree with our holding will likely mark it as the product of an activist judge. If so, they will have erred as this is manifestly not an activist Court. Rather, this case came to us as the result of the activism of an ill-informed faction on a school board, aided by a national public interest law firm eager to find a constitutional test case on ID, who in combination drove the Board to adopt an imprudent and ultimately unconstitutional policy. The breathtaking inanity of the Board's decision is evident when considered against the factual backdrop which has now been fully revealed through this trial. The students, parents, and teachers of the Dover Area School District deserved better than to be dragged into this legal maelstrom, with its resulting utter waste of monetary and personal resources.

As Jones had predicted, John G. West, Associate Director of the Center for Science and Culture, said:

The Dover decision is an attempt by an activist federal judge to stop the spread of a scientific idea and even to prevent criticism of Darwinian evolution through government-imposed censorship rather than open debate, and it won't work. He has conflated Discovery Institute's position with that of the Dover school board, and he totally misrepresents intelligent design and the motivations of the scientists who research it.

Newspapers have noted that the judge is "a Republican and a churchgoer".

The decision has been examined in a search for flaws and conclusions, partly by intelligent design supporters aiming to avoid future defeats in court. In its Winter issue of 2007, the Montana Law Review published three articles. In the first, David K. DeWolf, John G. West and Casey Luskin, all of the Discovery Institute, argued that intelligent design is a valid scientific theory, the Jones court should not have addressed the question of whether it was a scientific theory, and that the Kitzmiller decision will have no effect at all on the development and adoption of intelligent design as an alternative to standard evolutionary theory. In the second Peter H. Irons responded, arguing that the decision was extremely well reasoned and spells the death knell for the intelligent design efforts to introduce creationism in public schools, while in the third, DeWolf, et al., answer the points made by Irons. However, fear of a similar lawsuit has resulted in other school boards abandoning intelligent design "teach the controversy" proposals.

=== Anti-evolution legislation ===
Anti-evolution legislation, such as the Louisiana Science Education Act enacted in 2008, has been presented as supporting academic freedom and open discussion, while critics consider it a thinly disguised attempt at proselytization. In April 2010, the American Academy of Religion issued Guidelines for Teaching About Religion in K–12 Public Schools in the United States, which included guidance that creation science or intelligent design should not be taught in science classes, as "Creation science and intelligent design represent worldviews that fall outside of the realm of science that is defined as (and limited to) a method of inquiry based on gathering observable and measurable evidence subject to specific principles of reasoning." However, these worldviews as well as others "that focus on speculation regarding the origins of life represent another important and relevant form of human inquiry that is appropriately studied in literature or social sciences courses. Such study, however, must include a diversity of worldviews representing a variety of religious and philosophical perspectives and must avoid privileging one view as more legitimate than others."

== Status outside the United States ==
=== Europe ===
In June 2007, the Council of Europe's Committee on Culture, Science and Education issued a report, The dangers of creationism in education, which states "Creationism in any of its forms, such as 'intelligent design', is not based on facts, does not use any scientific reasoning and its contents are pathetically inadequate for science classes." In describing the dangers posed to education by teaching creationism, it described intelligent design as "anti-science" and involving "blatant scientific fraud" and "intellectual deception" that "blurs the nature, objectives and limits of science" and links it and other forms of creationism to denialism. On October 4, 2007, the Council of Europe's Parliamentary Assembly approved a resolution stating that schools should "resist presentation of creationist ideas in any discipline other than religion", including "intelligent design", which it described as "the latest, more refined version of creationism", "presented in a more subtle way". The resolution emphasises that the aim of the report is not to question or to fight a belief, but to "warn against certain tendencies to pass off a belief as science".

In the United Kingdom, public education includes religious education, and there are many faith schools that teach the ethos of particular denominations. When it was revealed that a group called Truth in Science had distributed DVDs produced by Illustra Media featuring Discovery Institute fellows making the case for design in nature, and claimed they were being used by 59 schools, the Department for Education and Skills (DfES) stated that "Neither creationism nor intelligent design are taught as a subject in schools, and are not specified in the science curriculum" (part of the National Curriculum, which does not apply to private schools or to education in Scotland). The DfES subsequently stated that "Intelligent design is not a recognised scientific theory; therefore, it is not included in the science curriculum", but left the way open for it to be explored in religious education in relation to different beliefs, as part of a syllabus set by a local Standing Advisory Council on Religious Education. In 2006, the Qualifications and Curriculum Authority produced a "Religious Education" model unit in which pupils can learn about religious and nonreligious views about creationism, intelligent design and evolution by natural selection.

On June 25, 2007, the UK Government responded to an e-petition by saying that creationism and intelligent design should not be taught as science, though teachers would be expected to answer pupils' questions within the standard framework of established scientific theories. Detailed government "Creationism teaching guidance" for schools in England was published on September 18, 2007. It states that "Intelligent design lies wholly outside of science", has no underpinning scientific principles, or explanations, and is not accepted by the science community as a whole. Though it should not be taught as science, "Any questions about creationism and intelligent design which arise in science lessons, for example as a result of media coverage, could provide the opportunity to explain or explore why they are not considered to be scientific theories and, in the right context, why evolution is considered to be a scientific theory." However, "Teachers of subjects such as RE, history or citizenship may deal with creationism and intelligent design in their lessons."

The British Centre for Science Education lobbying group has the goal of "countering creationism within the UK" and has been involved in government lobbying in the UK in this regard. Northern Ireland's Department for Education says that the curriculum provides an opportunity for alternative theories to be taught. The Democratic Unionist Party (DUP) – which has links to fundamentalist Christianity – has been campaigning to have intelligent design taught in science classes. A DUP former Member of Parliament, David Simpson, has sought assurances from the education minister that pupils will not lose marks if they give creationist or intelligent design answers to science questions. In 2007, Lisburn city council voted in favor of a DUP recommendation to write to post-primary schools asking what their plans are to develop teaching material in relation to "creation, intelligent design and other theories of origin".

Plans by Dutch Education Minister Maria van der Hoeven to "stimulate an academic debate" on the subject in 2005 caused a severe public backlash. After the 2006 elections, she was succeeded by Ronald Plasterk, described as a "molecular geneticist, staunch atheist and opponent of intelligent design". As a reaction to this situation in the Netherlands, the Director General of the Flemish Secretariat of Catholic Education (VSKO) in Belgium, Mieke Van Hecke, declared that: "Catholic scientists already accepted the theory of evolution for a long time and that intelligent design and creationism doesn't belong in Flemish Catholic schools. It's not the tasks of the politics to introduce new ideas, that's task and goal of science."

=== Australia ===
The status of intelligent design in Australia is somewhat similar to that in the UK. In 2005, the Australian Minister for Education, Science and Training, Brendan Nelson, raised the notion of intelligent design being taught in science classes. The public outcry caused the minister to quickly concede that the correct forum for intelligent design, if it were to be taught, is in religion or philosophy classes. The Australian chapter of Campus Crusade for Christ distributed a DVD of the Discovery Institute's documentary Unlocking the Mystery of Life (2002) to Australian secondary schools. Tim Hawkes, the head of The King's School, one of Australia's leading private schools, supported use of the DVD in the classroom at the discretion of teachers and principals.

=== Relation to Islam ===
Muzaffar Iqbal, a notable Pakistani-Canadian Muslim, signed "A Scientific Dissent From Darwinism", a petition from the Discovery Institute. Ideas similar to intelligent design have been considered respected intellectual options among Muslims, and in Turkey many intelligent design books have been translated. In Istanbul in 2007, public meetings promoting intelligent design were sponsored by the local government, and David Berlinski of the Discovery Institute was the keynote speaker at a meeting in May 2007.

=== Relation to ISKCON ===
In 2011, the International Society for Krishna Consciousness (ISKCON) Bhaktivedanta Book Trust published an intelligent design book titled Rethinking Darwin: A Vedic Study of Darwinism and Intelligent Design. The book included contributions from intelligent design advocates William A. Dembski, Jonathan Wells and Michael Behe as well as from Hindu creationists Leif A. Jensen and Michael Cremo.

== See also ==
- Abiogenesis
- Buddhism and evolution
- Clockwork universe
- Creation and evolution in public education
- Day-age creationism
- Evolution as fact and theory
- Gap creationism
- Genetic entropy
- Haldane's dilemma
- Hindu views on evolution
- History of evolutionary thought
- History of the creation–evolution controversy
- Intelligent design in politics
- Intelligent design and science
- Intelligent falling
- International Society for Complexity, Information, and Design
- Islamic views on evolution
- Jainism and non-creationism
- List of topics characterized as pseudoscience
- List of works on intelligent design
- Modern evolutionary synthesis
- Neo-creationism
- Neo-Darwinism
- Objections to evolution
- Philosophy of science
- Progressive creationism
- Raëlian intelligent design
- Santorum Amendment
- Scientific skepticism
- Social Darwinism
- Sternberg peer review controversy
- "Strengths and weaknesses of evolution"
- The eclipse of Darwinism
- Unintelligent design
