= Usenet II =

Proposed alternative to the classic Usenet hierarchy

Usenet II was a proposed alternative to the classic Usenet hierarchy, started in 1998. Unlike the original Usenet, it was peered only between "sound" (rules-compliant) sites and employed a system of rules to keep out spam.

Usenet II was backed by influential Usenetters like Russ Allbery.

== History ==
The newsgroup hierarchy in Usenet II revived the old naming system used by Usenet before the Great Renaming. All groups had names starting "net.", which serve to distinguish them from the "Big 8" (misc.*, sci.*, news.*, rec.*, soc.*, talk.*, comp.*, humanities.*). A separate checkgroup system, using the same technical mechanism as the one produced by David C. Lawrence for the Big 8, enforced the Usenet II hierarchy and prevented the creation of unauthorized newsgroups within it.

The basic principles of operation were controlled by the Steering Committee, which appointed "hierarchy czars" who were responsible for the content of specific portions of the namespace, or hierarchies.

Usenet II had strictly enforced rules. Readers of messages in Usenet II had to be fully compliant with the RFC 1036 (Usenet) standard plus some additional format compliance rules that were specific to Usenet II. A message header had to contain a valid email address in the From field. It was required to have an NNTP-Posting-Host header field containing a sound site. The distribution field was to be set to "4gh" (a reference to Shockwave Rider by John Brunner). If the Subject field started with "Re:", indicating a follow-up, there had to be a valid "References" field that contained the Message-ID of a previous message. Crossposts to groups outside the net.* hierarchy were cancelled automatically.

No message were allowed to spawn a discussion in more than three newsgroups. This applied both to the "newsgroups" field and the "Followup-To" field. It was permissible to post the same message three times. Posting the same message every day or every week was not permitted.

The effort to extend Usenet II was abandoned as technical means to fight spam and other abuse on traditional Usenet became more effective and spammers migrated from Usenet to email.

Sometime in 2010 or 2011, the web page for Usenet II went offline.

== See also ==
- Network News Transfer Protocol
- Usenet
