= Intelligent falling =

Parody of intelligent design

Intelligent falling (IF) is a parody of the intelligent design (ID) movement. It is a deliberately pseudoscientific supernatural explanation of the effects of gravity. The joke originated on Usenet, and has appeared in several online parodies. An article about Intelligent Falling in The Onion described free fall as being caused by "the hand of God".

Intelligent falling proposes that the scientific explanation of gravitational force cannot explain all aspects of the phenomenon, so credence should be given to the idea that things fall because a higher intelligence is moving them. Furthermore, IF asserts that theories explaining gravity are not internally consistent nor mathematically reconcilable with quantum mechanics, making gravity a "theory in crisis". IF also makes the claim that gravity is "only a theory", parodying the claims made by creationists regarding the theoretical status of evolution. IF apologists jokingly advocate that IF should be taught in school along with the theory of gravity so that students can make "an informed decision" on the subject, in a parody of the demands to "teach the controversy".

== History ==
In June 2002 a user named Jeff Stubbs posted a draft of a letter to the alt.atheism and talk origins Usenet groups that mentioned "intelligent grappling". He commented that "I don't like the theory of gravity, I feel personally insulted that engineers design structures only considering physical mass. What about our souls? I propose that science classes also teach the theory of 'Intelligent Grappling'. There's no way a weak force such as gravity can possibly hold everything onto the planet. It must be God, using our souls, to hold everything together." This was followed by Elf Sternberg posting a "FAQ on intelligent grappling" on the sci.skeptic usenet group. D. C. Simpson published, in May 2005, an I Drew This comic strip titled "Teaching Gravity".

Intelligent falling was the subject of an article in The Onion in August 2005. In the Dictionary of Contemporary Mythology (2011), author William R. Harwood suggested that while originally "hypothesized in a satirical magazine, it [Intelligent Falling] is no more incompetent than any other Intelligent Design theory".

Writing in 2008, science journalist Seth Shulman stated that the "pitch-perfect spoof" exemplified the issues with the basis of intelligent design, and with the inadequate response to it by the G. W. Bush administration.

== See also ==
- Church of the Flying Spaghetti Monster
- Parody religion
- Wedge strategy
- Occasionalism
