= List of newsgroups =

This is a partial list of newsgroups that are significant for their popularity or their position in Usenet history.

== The Big-8 hierarchies ==
These are the most widely distributed and carefully controlled newsgroup hierarchies. See Big 8 (Usenet) and the Great Renaming for more information.

=== comp ===
Computer-related topics.

=== humanities ===
Topics related to the humanities (fine arts, literature, philosophy, Classical Latin, etc.).

=== misc ===
Miscellaneous topics. Examples include:

- misc.legal.moderated — A moderated legal forum.
- misc.taxes.moderated — A moderated professional tax forum open to the general public.

=== news ===
Matters related to the functioning of Usenet itself.

- news.admin.announce (moderated)
- news.admin.net-abuse.blacklisting (moderated)
- news.admin.net-abuse.bulletins (moderated)
- news.admin.net-abuse.email — discussion of abuse of email by spammers and other parties.
- news.admin.net-abuse.misc
- news.admin.net-abuse.policy (moderated)
- news.admin.net-abuse.sightings (moderated)
- news.admin.net-abuse.usenet — discussion of abuse of usenet by spammers and other parties.

=== rec ===
Recreation and entertainment topics.

- rec.arts.sf.tv.babylon5.moderated—discussion of Babylon 5 and other projects of J. Michael Straczynski.

=== sci ===
Science-related topics.

=== soc ===
Discussion related to society and social subcultures. Examples include:

- soc.motss— for the discussion of gay and lesbian issues.
- soc.org.nonprofit— for the discussion of nonprofit organization management issues.
- soc.rights-human— for the discussion of human rights

=== talk ===
Discussion of various topics, especially controversial ones. Includes political topics as well.

- talk.origins — evolution-creationism controversy which maintains an extensive FAQ.

== The alt hierarchy ==
This is the most extensive newsgroup hierarchy outside of the Big 8. Examples include:

- alt.atheism — discusses atheism
- alt.binaries.slack — artwork created by and for the Church of the SubGenius.
- alt.config — creation of new newsgroups in the alt.* hierarchy.
- alt.sex — the first alt.* newsgroup for discussion of sexual topics.
- alt.sex.stories — text-based erotic stories of all types.
- alt.suicide.holiday — pro-choice discussion of suicide.
- alt.tv.simpsons — discusses the TV show The Simpsons.
- alt.horror.werewolves — discussed werewolf fiction and nonhuman identity.
