= TalkOrigins Archive =

Educational website

- Website type: Educational (science and evolution) and counter-apologetics
- Available in: English
- Owners: TalkOrigins Foundation (Texas, United States)
- Creators: Brett J. Vickers, Wesley R. Elsberry, Kenneth Fair
- Website: talkorigins.org
- Commercial: No
- Launched: 1994; 32 years ago

The TalkOrigins Archive is a website that presents scientific perspectives on the antievolution claims of young-earth, old-earth, and "intelligent design" creationists. With sections on evolution, creationism, geology, astronomy and hominid evolution, the web site provides broad coverage of evolutionary biology and the socio-political antievolution movement.

== Origins and history ==
The TalkOrigins Archive began in 1994 when Brett J. Vickers collected several separately posted FAQs from the talk.origins newsgroup and made them available from a single anonymous FTP site. In 1995, Vickers, then a computer science graduate student at the University of California, Irvine, created the TalkOrigins Archive web site. In 2001, Vickers transferred the TalkOrigins Archive to Wesley R. Elsberry, who organized a group of volunteers to handle the maintenance of the Archive.

In 2004, Kenneth Fair incorporated the TalkOrigins Foundation as a Texas 501(c)(3) non-profit organization. The Foundation's purposes include funding and maintaining the TalkOrigins Archive and holding copyrights to Archive articles, thereby simplifying the process of reprinting and updating those articles. The copyright issue has posed a particular problem since the FAQs started off as a small collection with little thought given to copyright but have since mushroomed. In 2005, the Foundation was granted tax-exempt status by the IRS.

== Features ==
The FAQs and FRAs (Frequently Rebutted Assertions) on the TalkOrigins Archive cover a wide range of topics associated with evolutionary biology and creationism. These include Mark Isaak's Index to Creationist Claims, a list of creationist positions on various issues, rebuttals, and links to primary source material. The TalkDesign site fulfills a similar role with the Intelligent Design movement. Also hosted is Jim Foley's Fossil Hominids sub-site which studies the evidence for human evolution and has an extensive list of links to websites on both evolutionary biology and creationism. Lastly, the Quote Mine Project examines the use of Quote mining – taking quotes out of context – by creationists. The feedback system collects reader comments and posts a compilation, along with responses, each month. The archive maintains a sister site which addresses Intelligent Design arguments.

== Awards and recognition ==
Talkorigins.org has gained awards and recognition over the years:

- In 1999, The New York Times called TalkOrigins a "good antidote" to the plethora of creationist websites that had sprung up.
- The webpages of the National Academy of Sciences, Smithsonian Institution, Leakey Foundation, the National Center for Science Education and other organizations recommend Talkorigins.org.
- In August 2002, Scientific American recognized Talkorigins.org for its "detailed discussions (some of which may be too sophisticated for casual readers) and bibliographies relating to virtually any objection to evolution that creationists might raise."
- In October 2006, The Dallas Morning News awarded it Web Site of the Week.

The Archive is also referenced in college-level textbooks and has had material from the archive incorporated into over 20 college or university courses.

== See also ==
- The Panda's Thumb
