= Kalugin =

Kalugin is a Russian surname. Notable people with the surname include:

- Erik Kalugin (1937–2003), Soviet sprint canoer
- Igor Kalugin (1943-2005), Soviet and Russian poet, known for an attempted aircraft hijacking on April 18, 1990
- Oleg Kalugin (born 1934), former Soviet KGB general
- Oleg Vladimirovich Kalugin (born 1989), Russian football midfielder
- Sergey Kalugin (born 1967), Russian musician, leader of the rock band Orgia Pravednikov
