= Alt.sex.stories =

Usenet newsgroup

alt.sex.stories is a Usenet newsgroup for erotic stories created on May 7, 1992, by Tim Pierce as an alternative to pre-existing alt erotica newsgroups. The group was initially unmoderated, a feature that was not shared by some of the other Usenet or altnet newsgroups. This feature allowed for greater user freedom.

== History ==
=== alt.sex.stories.moderated ===
In early 1997 a moderated version of alt.sex.stories was created due to an increasing number of posts by "various pay services, scam artists, and bots". During the twenty years in which it was active, the moderated newsgroup (ASSM) has always operated by cross-posting all approved stories to alt.sex.stories, and was not simply a filtered version of the unmoderated group. All stories posted to ASSM were specifically submitted there.

Day-to-day operations and general direction of ASSM were overseen by the Alt.Sex.Stories Text Repository (ASSTR), which coordinated a group of volunteers to moderate the newsgroup using a web-based voting system. ASSTR also hosts an archive of the newsgroup, and hosted a mirror of the Nifty Erotic Stories Archive (now located at nifty.org).

Eventually, ASSM became one of the few remaining active groups in the alt.sex.* hierarchy. Due to competition from web-based erotica sites and communities, the volume of stories posted to ASSM (and thus to alt.sex.stories) had dropped considerably by 2006. The group continued to be actively moderated until July 2017, but is no longer functional.

The asstr.org website was last updated in 2017 and is no longer stable, having dropped completely offline in July 2022 only to reappear (with no new content) in 2023. Much of the content is mirrored to other sites, but these may be severely out-of-date.

=== Notable authors ===
Alt.sex.stories is notable for assisting in the launch of several notable authors of erotica such as Elf Sternberg and Mary Anne Mohanraj.

=== Story codes ===
Because of the large volume of stories posted, a set of codes to describe the story content was developed. Writers were encouraged to include these story codes in the title of their stories.

== See also ==
- Alt.sex
- Alt.sex.bondage
