= CfV =

Part of the Usenet decision making process

A CfV (Call for Votes) is part of the Usenet decision making process. Usenet users are called upon to vote on a topical administrative issue, such as whether to create a particular newsgroup.

== See also ==
- Big-8 Management Board
- Big 8 (Usenet)
- Call for papers
- Usenet cabal
