= Elsberry =

Elsberry can refer to:

- Wesley R. Elsberry, marine biologist
- Elsberry, Missouri
- See also: Jacoby Ellsbury, Major League Baseball player
