= Ruslanov =

Ruslanov, feminine Ruslanova is a Russian-language patronymic surname derived from the given name Ruslan. Notable people with the surname include:

- Lidia Ruslanova, Soviet singer, Russian folk song performer
- Nina Ruslanova, Soviet and Russian theater and film actress
- Vadim Ruslanov, Russian soloist of the Alexandrov Ensemble
- Yuri Ruslanov, Russian musician from Orgia Pravednikov
