= Icons of Evolution =

Book by Jonathan Wells

Icons of Evolution, Science or Myth
- Cover
- Author: Jonathan Wells
- Language: English
- Subject: Intelligent design
- Publisher: Regnery Publishing
- Publication date: January 2002
- Publication place: United States
- Media type: Print (Paperback)
- Pages: 338
- ISBN: 0-89526-200-2
- OCLC: 49218581

Icons of Evolution is a book by Jonathan Wells, molecular biologist and advocate of the pseudoscientific intelligent design argument for the existence of God and fellow of the Discovery Institute, in which Wells criticizes the paradigm of evolution by attacking how it is taught. The book includes a 2002 video companion. In 2000, Wells summarized the book's contents in an article in the American Spectator. Several of the scientists whose work is sourced in the book have written rebuttals to Wells, stating that they were quoted out of context, that their work has been misrepresented, or that it does not imply Wells's conclusions.

The book was criticised for its claims that schoolchildren are deliberately misled, and its conclusions as to the evidential status of the theory of evolution, which is considered by scientists to be the central unifying paradigm of biology. Kevin Padian and Alan D. Gishlick wrote a review in Quarterly Review of Biology which said: "In our view, regardless of Wells's religious or philosophical background, his Icons of Evolution can scarcely be considered a work of scholarly integrity." Gishlick wrote a more detailed critique for the National Center for Science Education in his article "Icon of Evolution? Why much of what Jonathan Wells writes about evolution is wrong." Nick Matzke reviewed Wells' work in the talk.origins article Icon of Obfuscation, and Wells responded with A Response to Published Reviews (2002).

== Reception by the scientific community and criticism ==
The members of the scientific community who have reviewed Icons of Evolution have rejected his claims and conclusions. Scientists quoted in the work have accused Wells' of purposely misquoting them and misleading readers. This includes biologist Bruce Grant, who said Wells was "dishonest" with his work and biologist Jerry Coyne who said Wells "misused" and "mischaracterized" his work on peppered moths. Specific rejections stand beside the already broader response of the scientific community in overwhelmingly rejecting intelligent design as a valid scientific theory, instead seeing it as pseudoscience.

Nick Matzke reviewed the work in an article titled "Icon of Obfuscation", and critiqued the book chapter by chapter. Matzke concluded, "Icons of Evolution makes a travesty of the notion of honest scholarship", and that "Icons contains numerous instances of unfair distortions of scientific opinion, generated by the pseudoscientific tactics of selective citation of scientists and evidence, quote-mining, and 'argumentative sleight-of-hand', the last meaning Wells's tactic of padding his topical discussions with incessant, biased editorializing".

Jerry Coyne wrote Icons "rests entirely on a flawed syllogism: ... textbooks illustrate evolution with examples; these examples are sometimes presented in incorrect or misleading ways; therefore evolution is a fiction."

Of the Wells' motive, Alan D. Gishlick wrote:

It is clear from Wells's treatment of the "icons" and his grading scheme that his interest is not to improve the teaching of evolution, but rather to teach anti-evolutionism. Under Wells's scheme, teachers would be hostile to evolution as part of biology instruction. Wells and his allies hope that this would open the door to alternatives to evolution (such as "intelligent design") without actually having to support them with science...In conclusion, the scholarship of Icons is substandard and the conclusions of the book are unsupported. In fact, despite his touted scientific credentials, Wells doesn't produce a single piece of original research to support his position. Instead, Wells parasitizes on other scientists' legitimate work.

Likewise Frederick Crews of The New York Review of Books wrote: "Wells mines the standard evolutionary textbooks for exaggerated claims and misleading examples, which he counts as marks against evolution itself. His goal, of course, is not to improve the next editions of those books but to get them replaced by ID counterparts."

In 2002, Massimo Pigliucci devoted part of his Denying Evolution to refuting each point presented in Icons of Evolution. Amongst the refutations Pigliucci noted several mistakes Wells made and outlined how Wells oversimplified some issues to the detriment of the subject. Pigliucci also wrote an article-length review in BioScience and concludes, "Wells, as much as he desperately tries to debunk what to him is the most crucial component of evolutionary theory, the history of human descent, is backed against the wall by his own knowledge of biology." In 2005, Pigliucci debated Wells on Uncommon Knowledge on broader issues of evolution and intelligent design.

Barbara Forrest and Paul R. Gross discuss Wells' book in Creationism's Trojan Horse. One issue they highlighted was Wells' accusation that Haeckel forged images of embryos that are allegedly still in biology books. Forrest and Gross noted that Haeckel's, "a conservative Christian youth", work was "'fudged', as biologist Massimo Pigliucci says, not 'faked'." However, "we have excellent photographs, to which students can obtain easy access. Many or most colleges students of introductory biology actually see the embryos in the laboratory ..." Moreover, "vertebrate embryos, for most of the longest period of middevelopment, do look remarkably alike, pretty much, but not exactly, as Haeckel figured them in some of his drawings"(emphasis in original)."

Richard Weisenberg, biologist at Temple University, wrote an open letter to Wells in The Philadelphia Inquirer noting "Evolution by natural selection and the origin of life are entirely different subjects. ... The validity of any particular theory of biological origins (and there are several) has no relevancy to the well-established validity of evolution by natural selection." He continued, "I can only conclude that you have failed to master even a fraction of the massive body of evidence supporting the principle of evolution by natural selection."

The response of the single publisher named by Wells as having revised textbooks on the basis of his work has been condemned by Steven Schafersman, President of Texas Citizens for Science, and PZ Myers. That Wells' doctorate in biology at University of California, Berkeley was funded by Sun Myung Moon's Unification Church and a statement describing those studies as learning how to "destroy Darwinism" are viewed by the scientific community as evidence that Wells lacks proper scientific objectivity and mischaracterizes evolution by ignoring and misrepresenting the evidence supporting it while pursuing an agenda promoting notions supporting his religious beliefs in its stead. The Discovery Institute has stated in response that "Darwinists have resorted to attacks on Dr. Wells's religion."

In 2009, Patricia Princehouse, Professor at Case Western Reserve University, testified in a Mount Vernon City School District hearing that Icons was full of fraudulent representations of material in science textbooks. Christopher Hitchens describes the book as "unlikely even to rate a footnote in the history of piffle".

== Reception by creationists ==
The book has been praised by creationists and fellows of the Discovery Institute Dean Kenyon and Paul Chien.

== Wells's icons ==
Wells focused on 10 examples that he said were commonly used to teach evolution, which he called "icons". He evaluated how seven of these icons are treated in ten "widely used" high school and undergraduate textbooks. Although Wells established a grading scale for the textbooks, Alan Gishlick reported that the grading scale was poorly constructed and inconsistently used. Wells contended that the 10 case studies used to illustrate and teach evolution are flawed. Wells's ten "icons" were:

1	Miller–Urey experiment
2	Darwin's tree of life
3	Homology in vertebrate limbs
4	Haeckel's embryos
5	Archaeopteryx
6	Peppered moth
7	Darwin's finches
8	Four-winged fruit flies
9	Fossil horses
10	Hominid evolution

The last three "icons" – four-winged fruit flies, horse evolution, and human evolution – were discussed in the book, but Wells did not evaluate their coverage in textbooks. Although most textbooks cover the first seven "icons", they are not used as the "best evidence" of evolution in any of the textbooks.

=== Miller–Urey experiment ===
The Miller–Urey experiment was an experiment that simulated what were believed to be the conditions on the early Earth and tested the Oparin–Haldane model for chemical evolution. In Icons of Evolution Wells argued that since the atmospheric composition used in the experiment is now known to be incorrect, it should not be used in textbooks. Wells said that current ideas about the atmospheric composition of the early Earth makes this type of chemical synthesis impossible due to the presence of "significant" amounts of oxygen. Matzke contends that Wells mischaracterises pre-biotic levels of oxygen; although current estimates of the oxygen content are higher than those used in the experiment, they are still far more reducing than Wells suggests. Gishlick discussed fourteen other Miller–Urey type experiments which were able to synthesise amino acids under a variety of conditions, including ones that were done under conditions like those currently believed to have been present in at the time when life is thought to have originated.

Wells gave four textbooks a D grade, and the other six Fs. Gishlick contended that Wells criteria "stack the deck against [the textbooks], ensuring failure. Wells grading criteria give a C or worse to any textbook that has a picture of the Miller–Urey apparatus unless the figure caption explicitly says that the experiment is irrelevant, regardless of whether or not the text being illustrated by the picture states that the atmosphere used in the experiment was incorrect. Gishlick notes that even the intelligent design textbook, Of Pandas and People, would only receive a C. The claim that it is irrelevant is incorrect, as the experiment marked a major advance in studies of the origin of life, its results are still valid, and for teaching purposes it shows the methods of good experimental science.

=== Darwin's tree of life ===
Wells discussed the use of phylogenetic trees in biology textbooks, though Charles Darwin himself only included a schematic diagram in his works. Wells stated that textbooks do not adequately address the "Cambrian Explosion" and the emergence of "top-down" patterns of emergence of major phyla. He said that disagreements between morphological and molecular phylogenies disprove common ancestry and that textbooks should treat universal common descent as an unproven theory. Although Wells presented the Cambrian Explosion as happening too quickly for the diversity to have been generated through "Darwinian evolution", Gishlick pointed out that the Cambrian fauna developed over 60,000,000 years. In addition, the emergence of major phyla does not mean that they originated during that time period, but rather that they developed the characteristic features that allow them to be classified into existing phyla. In addition, since phylogenies summarize data, they are not presented as "evidence of evolution", but rather as summaries.

Wells gave two textbooks Ds and the other eight Fs. Gishlick pointed out that Wells did not use the grading system consistently, criticising books for failing to discuss the Cambrian Explosion if they do so without calling it an explosion.

=== Haeckel's embryos ===
PZ Myers, reviewing the chapter in which Wells takes on Haeckel's embryos, wrote:

Unfortunately, what Wells tries to do in this chapter is to take this invalid, discredited theory and tar modern (and even not so modern) evolutionary biology with it. The biogenetic law is not Darwinism or neo-Darwinism, however. It is not part of any modern evolutionary theory. Wells is carrying out a bait-and-switch here, marshalling the evidence and citations that properly demolish the Haeckelian dogma, and then claiming that this is part of "our best evidence for Darwin's theory." [...]

While Jonathan Wells would like to discredit evolution, and in Haeckel's embryos, he has found a story to his liking. There is a bit of intentional fakery to it, there is a clear affiliation with Darwin himself, and there is a long history of recognition of Haeckel's influence intermingled with unambiguous repudiation of his ideas. [...]

All he has to do is try to entangle Haeckel's discredited theories and poor modern reputation with the set of valid observations and modern explanations, and he can bury the truth under innuendo and association. [emphasis in original]

In 2003, Holt, Rinehart and Winston said it re-evaluated the use of the peppered moth and Haeckel's drawing of embryos from its textbook prior to publication. The publisher said, ". . . in Holt Biology Texas of the Miller–Urey experiment carefully indicates the mistakes made in the assumptions about the early atmosphere. Throughout Holt Biology Texas, the theory of evolution is described as a true scientific theory that will be refined and improved in the light of new evidence."

To Wells' assertion in Icons that Haeckel's embryos and recapitulation theory appearing in biology textbooks is evidence of flaws in the teaching of evolution, Myers said "I'd say Jonathan Wells' claim is pretty much dead. Haeckel's work is not one of the pillars upon which evolution is built, and biologists have been saying so for at least 85 years (and more like over a century). Next time one of those clowns tries to haunt modern biology with the ghost of Ernst Haeckel, just look 'em in the eye and tell them they're full of crap." The documentary Flock of Dodos challenges Wells' assertion, widely repeated by design advocates, that Haeckel's embryos are widespread in evolution textbooks.

Science communicator Brian Switek said "If one reads Wells' criterion for his bogus A–F grading scale for the textbooks in Icons, it quickly becomes apparent that even publishing illustrations that resemble Haeckel's to illustrate his folly will garner the book a D, the only difference between a D and an F in Wells' mind being a 'D' grade book selecting a few embryos rather than publishing the full swath Haeckel originally doctored." PZ Myers says of Wells's claim about the use of Haeckel drawings in modern textbooks "They repeat the claim that Haeckel's embryos and all that silly recapitulation theory are still endemic in biology textbooks. It's not true, no matter how much they whine about it. I've gone over a number of these textbooks, and what you typically find at worst is a figure of the Haeckel diagrams for historical interest with an explanation that rejects recapitulation theory; more often what you find are photos or independently redrawn illustrations of the embryos."

=== Darwin's finches ===
In the chapter on Darwin's finches, Wells argues that Darwin's finches were merely a "speculative afterthought". Wells claims that ornithologist David Lack is more to be credited with the popular finches, and that it was Lack who paraded the finches and claimed that they were instrumental in Darwin's theories. This claim is contradicted by Alan D. Gishlick and Dave Wisker, who state that Darwin was in fact heavily influenced by the finches as early as 1837, with Wisker stating that "Wells seems to be the one doing the speculating". Wells argues that, rather than evolving, the finch species may be "merging", combining from multiple species into a single species rather than diverging from a single species into multiple species. Wells argues that, due to interbreeding between many of the finch "species", the 13 species may actually be less than previously thought. Contradicting this, Gishlick states that the separation "according to which species are separated by behaviors that lead animals to recognize potential mates" is "widely accepted". Wisker states that hybridization among finch species on the Galápagos Islands is, in fact, rare. Both agree that even if hybridization did occur, it would be irrelevant, because evolution does not specifically require divergence. Wisker concludes:

The general reader is done a great disservice by this chapter in Icons of Evolution. Jonathan Wells does not sufficiently address the biographical or scientific literature on Darwin's Finches to enable the reader to make an informed decision regarding his argument. He writes, with exquisite irony, 'It makes one wonder how much evidence there really is for Darwin's theory'. Since, as we have seen, Wells avoids most of it regarding Darwin's Finches, one wonders how much evidence there is to support his book.

== Cover picture ==
The book's title is a reference to the famous picture March of Progress. This drawing, by Rudolph Zallinger, was published in the Time-Life book Early Man in 1965 and shows a sequence of primates walking from left to right, starting with a non-human ape on the left, progressing through a series of hominids, and finishing with a modern human on the right. A version of the drawing is on the cover of the book, and Wells describes it as the "ultimate icon" of evolution.

== Video ==
In 2002, a video titled Icons Of Evolution and produced by Coldwater Media. In it, Wells discusses the ideas presented in the book. The video also covers the story of Roger DeHart, one of the Discovery Institute's media campaigns claiming discrimination. The Seattle Weekly recalled the DeHart issue saying the video did not tell "the whole truth".

== Kitzmiller v. Dover Area School District ==
At meetings of the Dover Area School District Board of Education, in Pennsylvania, in June 2004, "six day" creationist board member Bill Buckingham made statements supporting creationism and objected to proposed use of the textbook Biology written by Kenneth R. Miller. The story appeared in York County newspapers, and Buckingham was telephoned by Discovery Institute staff attorney Seth Cooper, whose tasks included "communicating with ‘legislators, school board members, teachers, parents and students" to “address the topic of ID in a scientifically and educationally responsible way” in public schools. Following discussions, Cooper sent the book and DVD of Icons of Evolution to Buckingham, who required the Dover High School botany teachers to watch the DVD. They did not take up the opportunity to use it in their classes. The school board subsequently introduced a requirement that teachers read a statement to students in the ninth-grade biology class at Dover High School, asserting that Darwin's theory of evolution "is still being tested as new evidence is discovered. The theory is not a fact. Gaps in the theory exist for which there is no evidence." This led to the Kitzmiller v. Dover Area School District case which found that intelligent design is a form of creationism, and the school board policy was unconstitutional.
