= CFV =

CFV may refer to:

- CfV (Call for Votes), in Usenet
- Chemin de fer du Vivarais, a tourist railway in the South of France
- Colorado for Family Values, American advocacy group
- M3 Bradley, Cavalry Fighting Vehicle (CFV)
