= The Panda's Thumb =

The Panda's Thumb may refer to:

- The sesamoid bone of the Giant Panda, used similarly to a human thumb, cited as evidence of evolution and the main feature of an essay by Stephen Jay Gould
- The Panda's Thumb (book), also known as The Panda's Thumb: More Reflections in Natural History, a 1980 book by Stephen Jay Gould featuring an essay on the Panda's thumb
- The Panda's Thumb (blog), a blog that discusses evolutionary biology and the creation-evolution controversy from a scientific perspective
