= The Gospel of Afranius =

1995 book by Kirill Eskov

- 1995 Russian language cover Евангелие от Афрания
- Author: Kirill Eskov
- Original title: Евангелие от Афрания
- Language: Russian
- Genre: Religious criticism, historical novel, spy novel
- Publisher: Self-published (1st edition)
- Publication date: 1995
- Publication place: Russia
- Media type: Print

The Gospel of Afranius (Russian: Евангелие от Афрания, romanized: Evangeliye ot Afraniya) is a 1995 counterapologetic polemic by Russian scientist and writer Kirill Eskov, consisting of an essay and a novel. Its novel part is a dramatic portrayal of Jesus. In this work, Eskov constructs a demythologised account of the events of the Gospels.

== Publication history ==
As described by Eskov, earnest attempts of his religious close friend, Sergey Kalugin, a musician and poet, to convert him led him to creation of this book as a response. Eskov self-published this work in 1995 after several Russian book publishers turned him down, as they feared the book could spark a controversy and draw the ire of the resurgent Russian Orthodox Church. As of 2020, it has received five subsequent editions in Russian by regular publishers (2001 by ACT, 2003 by Фолио, 2005 by ЭНАС, 2016 by Алькор Паблишерс and 2019 by Престиж Бук); the latter three are anthologies combining it with several other works by Eskov. In 2003 it was also translated to Polish (and published by Solaris). Spanish and Bulgarian translations were also published.

An online English version, endorsed by Eskov, appeared in December 2022.

== Structure and plot ==
The book is divided into two parts. The first part is a non-fiction essay and polemic in which the author, a Russian biologist, challenges the claims made by Josh McDowell, an American evangelical apologist and evangelist, in his book The Resurrection Factor (1981). McDowell's book argues that events portrayed in the New Testament, specifically, the resurrection of Jesus, cannot be explained without miracles and have to be seen as a proof of the direct intervention of God. Eskov took McDowell's book as a challenge and decided to publish his own in response. In this part of the book, he overviews the known historical facts and engages with a number of McDowell's arguments.

The second part of the book is a novel and a dramatic portrayal of Jesus, through a story of Afranius (a character from Mikhail Bulgakov's Master and Margarita), in the novel said to be the head of Pontius Pilate's secret service, and his successful manipulation of Jesus Christ and the apostles. The Romans are concerned with the violent opposition to their rule from the factions associated with the religion of Judaism, and design a plan (Operation Ichthys) to create a new, more pacifist local religious movement that would weaken (and ideally eclipse) the dominant Judaism factions while being less antagonistic to the Roman rule. For that purpose they choose a new sect organized around Jesus Christ as the most suitable to their goals (cf. John 11:47-48), and infiltrate it with an undercover operative (Judas), tasked among other things with spreading miracle stories like Jesus walking on water by pretending to have eyewitnessed them (which would be later repeated by others to create the Ascension narrative). Meanwhile, John the Baptist, seen as a competitor to Jesus, is executed. The Roman plot culminates with the Roman agents staging two fake resurrections (first of Lazarus of Bethany, second of Jesus). The plan succeeds at discrediting the rabbinical court (Sanhedrin) and deceiving the apostles who became convinced they witnessed a series of supernatural miracles, while in fact what they have seen were staged events orchestrated by paid performers and Roman agents.

Due to intense operational secrecy, Pilate and Afranius do not report about this discretionary operation to Rome, and their secret is thus soon gone, with a hidden scroll being the only memory of it. The plan also partially succeeds in the long term when Jewish-Christians refuse to participate in the Jewish War, confirming Pilate and Afranius's foresight. Their plan has an unexpected and unforeseen byproduct: upon having a religious vision, Paul of Tarsus starts converting Gentiles to Christianity, starting a new world religion (and this, according to the narrative, is the second true coincidence important for the origins of Christianity - likened in the book to a virus, one that has both "escaped from a lab" and randomly mutated - after Peter misunderstands Joseph's reply from mountain fog, praising his son Jesus, as the direct voice of God).

The story is Eskov's narration of his preceding essay's positions, arguing that all the events as portrayed in the New Testament, and corroborated by known archeological and historical evidence, could be explained without the need for a supernatural intervention; moreover, Eskov points out that some facts, like the reference to the resurrected Jesus having a "different form" in Mark 16:12, or lack of an appearance to Jesus's mother Mary (not mentioned in either the Gospels or Paul's list), as well as some subtler considerations, are more naturally explained by his hypothesis than by bona fide miracles; he also notes that even without taking the evidence into account, his explanation is more plausible than the explanation that Jesus actually rose from the dead and flew up into the sky to sit on a throne in Heaven. (The other major alleged miraculous act of God, creation of the world ex nihilo, is also discussed in the appendix of the book for completeness and is likewise offered a token miracle-free alternative consistent with cosmological constraints, namely that the origin of the Universe came from a quantum foam bubble in another eternal empty Universe; the translator later published another model, presented by Aron Ra.)

== Reception ==
In 1997, the book won the Grand Prix at the Festival of Science Fiction Authors in Odesa (Fancon, Фанкон). It also won a Big Zilant award in 2001 at the Zilantkon. Reviewing this work for Nature in 1998, Mikhail Mina noted that it is an expression of Soviet-era state atheism clashing with post-Soviet resurgence of religious belief. He observes that it is both a pleasant read (with "humour [that] is sometimes biting, but never insulting") and a successful counter to McDowell, noting that it would likely "find many interested readers if it were published in English".

Richard Carrier noted that this work is "popular in the slavic world, from Russia, Poland, the Baltics, and Ukraine" and "much overlooked" in the West; he praised it and concluded that it "disproves Christianity".

== See also ==
- Political decoy § Sukarno/unknown (1950s)
- Zersetzung
- "The Legend of Sleepy Hollow"
- Myth of Er § Comparative mythology
- Scarlet Sails
- Historicity of Jesus
