= Alt.sex.bondage =

Usenet newsgroup

Alt.sex.bondage (asb) was a Usenet newsgroup from the alt.sex hierarchy created in 1989 for discussion of topics related to alternative sex. It ended on 28 December 1996, when CompuServe closed 200 forums without warning. It became known for having the first registered discussions about topics related to fetishism, and for the first known register of the acronym "BDSM".

== History ==
Alt.sex.bondage was created in 1989, when a moderator of alt.sex tried to create a flame-war by asking in several newsgroups for users to share their fetishist fantasies. The flaming did not work, but he received many sincere answers that he decided to create the newsgroup. The newsgroup was hosted by the University of Waterloo.

On 28 December 1996, CompuServe closed 200 forums, including asb, without warning after the company was held accountable for illegal pornographic material, including child pornography, in Munich, Germany, and sentenced to use "every means available" to delete such materials. After its termination, similar forums, such as soc. and soc.subculture.bondage-bdsm (s.s.b-b) rose on popularity.

== Functionality and popularity ==
One of the main functionalities of the newsgroup was the possibility of sending anonymous messages. In this case, the return address displayed would be one belonging to the forum, such as anon.penet. Another feature was the "Spivak gender", where gendered pronouns were replaced to genderless ones. The forum had no splicit rules and almost no moderation. As a result, spams were common.

Asb was very popular at a time, and registered access from IPs coming from Microsoft, NASA and several universities. According to Wired, "another probable reason for asb's popularity is that HIV has forced more heterosexuals to look for alternative methods of sexual expression". The website gained attention for its heavy topics, but according to Slate, a research conducted in Canada showed that most of the users were adept of "softcore" sex.

== Content ==
Differently from similar newsgroups, asb was focused in specific and fetishist topics. The newsgroup was broad, and ranged from discussions about fetishism to stories, that could be minimalistic or "multipart sagas". One famous story was "Cindy's Torment", written by Anonymous John and published between the late 1989 and January 1990, that featured "an Asian secretary [that] is forced by financial pressure to accept into sexual slavery". The story culminated in the ban of the entire alt.sex hierarchy from the University of Waterloo by the Provost Alan George on the grounds of "financial costs".

One of the main features of asb was alt.sex.bondageFAQ, that featured the first registered discussions about topics related to BDSM. The forum was moderated by Rob Jellinghaus and many topics were translated to several languages. The translations in Portuguese were made by the website Desejo Secreto (Secret Desire).

Before the creation of asb, topics related to BDSM were discussed specially on the feminist community. The forum has the first registered discussions about "trigger warnings, BDSM specific anti-domestic violence resources, and community wide conversations about the existence of rape and abuse in BDSM". One famous topic was the so-called "Holy War", a discussion about the amount of power a S&M relationship should have. According to the Oxford Dictionary, the forum featured the first use of the acronym "BDSM", on 20 June 1991 from an anonymous repply to the user Quarterhorse Says. Other terms created by the users are "Total Power Exchange" and the maxim "Ugol's Law", where "to any question beginning with 'am I the only one who...?' the answer is 'no'".

== See also ==
- Alt.sex.stories
