= Nick Matzke =

Science blogger

Nicholas J. Matzke is the former Public Information Project Director at the National Center for Science Education (NCSE) and served an instrumental role in NCSE's preparation for the 2005 Kitzmiller v. Dover Area School District trial. One of his chief contributions was discovering drafts of Of Pandas and People which demonstrated that the term "intelligent design" was later substituted for "creationism". This became a key component of Barbara Forrest's testimony. (Note: I guess ID really was "Creationism's Trojan Horse" after all, Panda's Thumb) After the trial he co-authored a commentary in Nature Immunology, (Note: PT posters in Nature Immunology, The Panda's Thumb, April 22, 2006) was interviewed on Talk of the Nation, and was profiled in Seed as one of nine "revolutionary minds". (Note: Seed Magazine — “Nick Matzke, Legal Beagle” The Panda's Thumb, October 3, 2006)

== Training and career ==
Matzke earned a B.S. in biology and chemistry from Valparaiso University, and a master's degree in geography from U.C. Santa Barbara. He undertook Ph.D. studies in evolutionary biology at the University of California, Berkeley with John Huelsenbeck earning his degree in 2013. He was previously a postdoctoral fellow at the National Institute for Mathematical and Biological Synthesis. Matzke is currently a phylogeneticist at the School of Biological Sciences at the University of Auckland, having previously been a Discovery Early Career Research Award (DECRA) fellow at the Australian National University.

== Work and publications ==
Matzke regularly blogs at The Panda's Thumb. In 2003, he wrote a lengthy paper about the evolution of flagella and has continued to challenge claims from intelligent design proponents that flagella are irreducibly complex. (Note: Flagellum evolution in Nature Reviews Microbiology, The Panda's Thumb.) He co-authored a critique of Stephen C. Meyer's paper that became important in the Sternberg peer review controversy. (Note: Meyer's Hopeless Monster, The Panda's Thumb) He also wrote a chapter-by-chapter critique of Jonathan Wells' book Icons of Evolution, which he described as a "travesty of the notion of honest scholarship" that is "shot through with misrepresentations." In addition to "a bevy of its own errors," Matzke stated that the book contained "numerous instances of unfair distortions of scientific opinion, generated by the pseudoscientific tactics of selective citation of scientists and evidence, quote-mining, and 'argumentative sleight-of-hand,' [by which Matzke means] Wells's tactic of padding his topical discussions with incessant, biased editorializing." While still with the NCSE, he collaborated with Paul R. Gross to contribute a chapter on the use of critical analysis by antievolutionists to their 2006 book Not in Our Classrooms. In less serious or formal work, he co-authored a research parody based on NCSE's Project Steve. He first made a name for himself posting on talk.origins as "Nic Tamzek". He has also written articles on such topics for the popular press.

He is the author of the 2013 R package BioGeoBEARS, which enables statistical comparison of probabilistic models of how the geographic ranges of species evolve on phylogenies, such as models that include or exclude founder-event speciation, geographic distance, or dispersal-influencing traits. He also authored a 2015 paper in the journal Science conducting a dated, Bayesian phylogenetic analysis of antievolution legislation proposed or passed in the United States in the decade following Kitzmiller v. Dover.
