= Elf Sternberg =

American writer (born 1966)

Elvis M. Sternberg (born May 7, 1966) is an American writer, and the former keeper of the alt.sex FAQ. He is also the author of many erotic stories and articles on sexuality and sexual practices, and is considered one of the most notable and prolific online erotica authors.

Sternberg's best known piece of writing is probably the erotic short story “The Only Fair Game”, which became famous/infamous for raising legal questions about fan fiction. Its speculation about homosexual and BDSM practices among Larry Niven's Kzinti got Sternberg a cease-and-desist letter from Niven's lawyers in an incident that to date remains notorious within the SF fandom community. Elf Sternberg claims the story is covered under parody protections; Larry Niven maintains that the story is a violation of copyright, but has not pursued further legal action. Larry Niven commented directly on this issue in a Slashdot interview. Sternberg is also the creator of The Journal Entries of Kennet R'yal Shardik, a long-running series of short erotica featuring a massive body of work covering the fictional ringworld Pendor (The Pendorwright Projects), and the wide variety of humans, humanoid species, robots, and artificial intelligences that inhabit it.

He has been a regular poster on the Usenet groups alt.sex, rec.arts.sf.written, rec.arts.sf.composition and alt.atheism, and is listed on the Net.Legends FAQ.

== Pendor ==
Pendor is a fictional ringworld from the Pendorwright stories written by Elf Sternberg. It rotates around a center star Pin, its day-night cycle simulated by a ring of shadow blocks rotating between Pendor and Pin, creating 292 day/night cycles per earth year. The system also includes a planet called Pandora, its moon Pindam and a space station called Parma.

In one of the earliest Journal Entries, Kennet Shardik travels back in time to give an earlier version of himself his Artificial Intelligence, named Fawn Destiniere. The earlier Shardik, after consultation with Fawn, decided to create Pendor. They created it in a "pocket universe", where it developed while Shardik was in suspended animation. When it was ready to support life, Shardik, Fawn, and other AIs developed new species to live there, including Centaurs, Dragons, Felinzi, and Tindals. Immediately before the first Centaur was decanted, Shardik delivered Fawn to himself and, on his return, dumped all of the databanks, so that the inhabitants, both silicon- and carbon-based, would have to explore and learn about it on their own. 93 Pendorian years later, the pocket universe was opened up and Pendor moved into our universe. As Pendor is explored, a network of SDisks is built, facilitating transportation around the world.

At the end of the universe, Fawn maintains a base on Pindam through to the singularity, and then causes a second Big Bang, speaking the words, "Let there be."

Pendor, and the races originating from Pendor collectively known as "Pendorians", are the subject of many of Sternberg's "Journal Entries", which form one of the oldest and certainly one of the largest erotic science fiction story collections ever created within a single universe.
