= Big 8 (Usenet) =

Group of newsgroup hierarchies

The Big 8 (previously the Big 7) are a group of newsgroup hierarchies established after the Great Renaming, a restructuring of Usenet that occurred during 1987. These hierarchies are managed by the Big 8 Management Board. Groups are added by a process of nomination, discussion and voting.

== History ==
The original seven hierarchies were comp.*, misc.*, news.*, rec.*, sci.*, soc.*, and talk.*. They were open and free for anyone to participate with (except for the moderated newsgroups), though they were subject to a few general rules governing their naming and distribution.

alt.* is not part of the original seven but was created separately as a venue with more freedom and fewer rules than the Big 7.

During April 1995, a time when Usenet traffic had increased significantly, humanities.* was introduced and it and the seven hierarchies created by the Renaming comprise the present so-called "Big 8".

== Hierarchies ==
Hierarchy	Description	Examples
comp.*	Computer-related discussions	comp.software, comp.sys.amiga, comp.browsers.www
humanities.*	Humanities topics	humanities.music.composers.wagner
misc.*	Miscellaneous topics	misc.education, misc.forsale, misc.kids
news.*	Newsgroup-related matters. This hierarchy was not originally intended for reporting news events. It was meant to deal with matters of Usenet in particular	news.groups, news.admin, news.admin.net-abuse.email, news.announce.groups
rec.*	Recreation and entertainment	rec.music, rec.arts.movies, rec.arts.poetry, rec.arts.sf.tv.babylon5.moderated
sci.*	Science-akin discussions	sci.physics, sci.research, sci.skeptic
soc.*	Social discussions	soc.college.org, soc.culture.African, soc.history.what-if
talk.*	Talk about various controversial topics and discussions with no obvious categorization	talk.religion, talk.politics, talk.bizarre, talk.origins

== The Big 8 Management Board ==
The Big 8 Management Board was originally created in 2005 from former moderators of the news.announce.newgroups. The board's mission is to:

- create well-named, well-used newsgroups in the Big-8 Usenet hierarchies;
- make necessary adjustments to existing groups;
- remove groups that are not well-used; and
- assist and encourages the support of a canonical Big-8 newsgroup list by Usenet sites.

== See also ==
- alt.* hierarchy
- Great Renaming
