= Off topic =

Topic outside the bounds of the current discussion

In the context of mailing lists, discussion groups, discussion forums, bulletin boards, newsgroups, and wikis a contribution is off-topic if it is not within the bounds of the current discussion, and on-topic if it is.

Even on very specialized forums and lists, off-topic posting is not necessarily frowned upon, but a common netiquette convention is to mark a new off-topic posting or email by beginning it with "OT" - for example in a forum discussing the Linux operating system someone might post: "OT: Did anyone else see that giant goose?".

Posting off-topic messages to deliberately aggravate other members is a form of trolling.

== See also ==
- Netiquette
