= Counter-apologetics =

Refutation of religious apologetics

Within criticism of religion, counter-apologetics is a field of thought that criticizes religious apologetics. Every religious apologist criticizes the defense of other religions, though the term counter-apologetics is frequently applied to criticism of religion in general by freethinkers and atheists. Luke Muehlhauser, the former executive director of the Machine Intelligence Research Institute, defines counter-apologetics as "a response to Christian apologetics...examining the claims and tactics of Christian apologists and then equipping [a thinker] with skeptical responses to them".

Christian apologist and blogger J.W. Wartick wrote "counter-counter apologetics" in response to Matt Dillahunty's Iron Chariots counter-apologetics encyclopedia, named for a passage in Judges 1 in which God was unable to lead the Israelites to victory over an enemy because that enemy had chariots of iron.

On his blog, as part of his "why they don't believe" series ("why they reject Christianity and/or theism"), Christian apologist and theologian Randal Rauser invited an anonymous blogger who calls himself Counter Apologist to explain his counter-apologetics, and Rauser provided his own counter-arguments.

The New Testament is well understood to contain apologetics, but counter-apologetics also appears in Christian theology. Theologian John Milbank has written in a 2012 work that Christianity "makes room for" counter-apologetics by not being a Gnostic system of thought, and notes the "authentic Christian fusion of apologetic and counter-apologetic" as it stands in opposition to the anti-materialist nihilism of Browning's Caliban. Likewise, Biblical scholar and theologian Loveday Alexander has written that analysis of the Bible's books Luke and Acts by two other authors shows they contain counter-apologetic features perhaps to convey a pro-Roman perspective to the reader.

== See also ==
- The Gospel of Afranius
- TalkOrigins Archive
- Mormon studies § Counter-apologetics
