= Nifty Erotic Stories Archive =

Online repository of erotic literature

- Available in: English
- Website: nifty.org
- Launched: 1993
- Current status: Active

Nifty Erotic Stories Archive, also known as nifty.org and Nifty, is an extensive semi-curated website of erotic literature established in 1993.

== Background ==
The site collects LGBT-themed stories by amateur writers as well as "General Erotic and Educational Information", with stories categorized by theme and subject matter such as "first time", "interracial", fan-fiction, “camping” and other categories. Fan-fiction historian Laura Hale has noted that "Historically, this archive is not viewed as a home to true fan fiction but rather celebrity based erotica which was absent the fannish fan fiction context".

As of February 25, 2023, the site contains over 300,000 stories. The site accepts direct submissions and is independently hosted, but mirrored at the Alt Sex Stories Text Repository and many other sites, in several countries. In 2000, it was recognized by the U.S. Internal Revenue Service as a tax-exempt, nonprofit 501(c) organization. The site is free and maintained by volunteer labor only, and relies on user donations. Nifty does not have a registration process, an aspect that has drawn criticism, as the site does not require users to verify that they are over the age of 18.

In 2012 online payment company Stripe suspended Nifty's account due to the site hosting stories featuring bestiality, which Stripe believed would violate Visa and MasterCard's brand protection rules. Nifty contested this action, stating that it violated their First Amendment right to freedom of speech, and the decision was later overturned.

== In academic research ==
Nifty.org was used as a source for one million words of gay male erotic narratives, and a comparison million words of lesbian erotic narratives, by Paul Baker of Lancaster University, in a study of "the identity constructions and language use of those who are viewed as ideal sexual partners; important themes or narrative patterns within the texts which reveal the discourses of sexuality that the authors have accessed; [and] the language that gay consumers/creators of erotic texts find to be sexually arousing".

In 2000 OutProud published data from a survey they had conducted with Oasis magazine where the intent was to find ways to improve communication with the target communities they served. OutProud discovered that a large amount of their survey respondents (51%) had found the survey through Nifty or a Nifty-related link, which surprised the surveyors as they had not approached the site for assistance with the survey. The surveyors also found that the Nifty respondents fit more accurately into the target communities they were trying to approach, as they found that other sources did not represent all of the communities OutProud and Oasis were hoping to receive surveys from.

== Sections ==
Several identical subcategories appear in the lesbian, gay, and bisexual sections. They are:

- Adult Friends
- Adult Youth
- Athletics
- Authoritarian
- Beginnings
- Celebrity
- College
- Encounters
- High School
- Incest
- Interracial
- Masturbation
- Science Fiction or Fantasy
- Urination
- Young Friends

In addition, some subcategories appear only in the gay and bisexual sections:

- Camping
- Historical
- Military
- Relationships
- Rural

The Bestiality section of the website has not been discontinued despite coming under heavy criticism.

Section	Subsections
Bisexual	Jockey Hollow
Gay	First Time; No Sex; Non-English
Lesbian	Battle; Bondage; Hookers; Miscellaneous; Romance
Transgender	Joe Bates Saga; Magic & Science Fiction; Non TG-Stories; Authoritarian; by Authors; Chemical; College; Control; High School; Mind-control; She-male; Surgery; Teen; TV; Young Friends
