= Alt.sex =

Usenet newsgroup

alt.sex is a Usenet newsgroup – a discussion group within the Usenet network – relating to human sexual activity. It was popular in the 1990s. An October 1993 survey by Brian Reid reported an estimated worldwide readership for the alt.sex newsgroup of 3.3 million, that being 8% of the total Usenet readership, with 67% of all Usenet "nodes" (news servers users log in to access the system) carrying the group. At that time, alt.sex had an estimated traffic of 2,300 messages per month.

The newsgroup hierarchy below alt.sex comprises several newsgroups, including alt.sex.stories (which is the biggest newsgroup in the hierarchy after alt.sex itself), alt.sex.pictures, alt.sex.blondes, alt.sex.bondage, alt.sex.bestiality, and alt.sex.rape. The former four newsgroups generally feature text and images similar to the type that can be found in mainstream adult magazines, such as Playboy or Penthouse. The latter three newsgroups exemplify a set of sub-groups that deals in more "extreme" or less socially accepted topics. Other sub-groups include some with intentionally humorous names, such as alt.sex.aluminum.baseball.bat, alt.sex.boredom, and alt.sex.bestiality.hamster.duct-tape. There are more newsgroups on the less mainstream topics or sub-cultures, although as of 1998 they were generally far lower in traffic than those that deal in the more mainstream sexual behaviours. In a 1993 analysis of the alt.sex hierarchy, Maureen Furniss concluded that "sexually oriented boards act as a kind of support group for people who post notices to them, especially individuals whose sexual orientations are very marginalized (those who practice sadomasochism or bestiality, for example)."

The first usenet BDSM newsgroup, alt.sex.bondage, was created in 1991. The term BDSM itself was first recorded on a post in alt.sex.bondage in 1991.

The University of Waterloo in 1994 ceased carrying alt.sex.bondage, alt.sex.bestiality, alt.sex-stories, and alt.sex-stories.d upon the recommendation of its ethics committee, which had expressed concerns that the content of those newsgroups may have violated the Canadian Criminal Code.

alt.sex.cancel is a Usenet newsgroup set up specifically to help combat newsgroup spam cross-posted to the entire alt.sex hierarchy. The newsgroup is a simple "spamtrap" – a trap used to collect samples of unsolicited messages that can then be acted on by an automated anti-spam system. According to its charter, any message posted to alt.sex.cancel may be cancelled automatically.

The well-known mass-mailing macro computer virus called the "Melissa virus" was originally distributed via the alt.sex newsgroup. It was hidden inside a list purporting to contain passwords to pornographic websites. The messages containing the virus were posted with message headers claiming that the post had been written using the America Online (AOL) account of Scott Steinmetz, whose username was "skyroket". Kizza reports that the headers on the post were probably forged by Melissa's author, David L. Smith.
