= Discussion group =

A group that gathers to discuss ideas

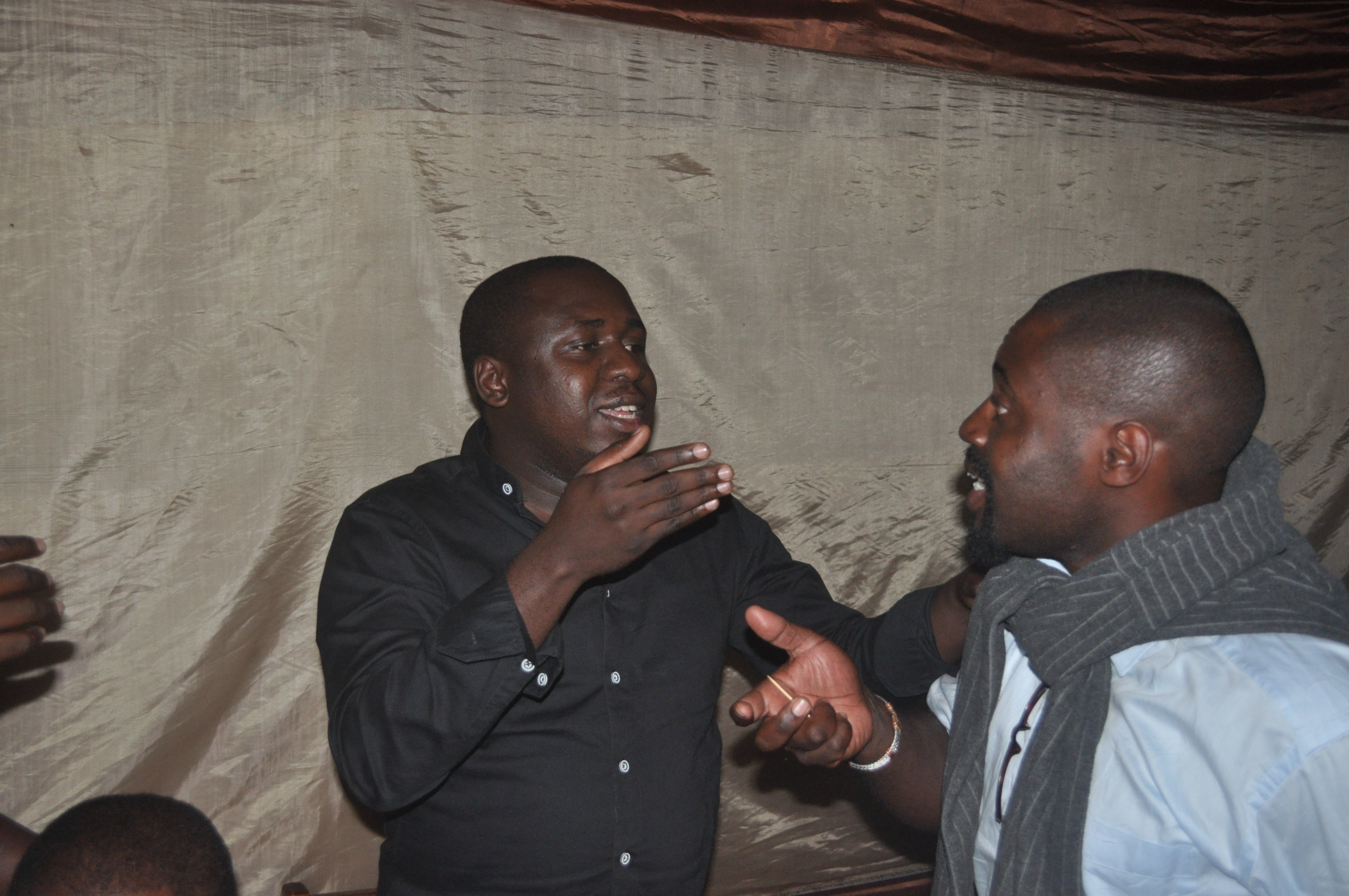
A small discussion group brainstorming in Bukavu, Congo

A discussion group is a group of individuals, typically who share a similar interest, who gathers formally or informally to discuss ideas, solve problems, or make comments. Common methods of conversing including meeting in person, conducting conference calls, using text messaging, or using a website such as an Internet forum. People respond, add comments, and make posts on such forums, as well as on established mailing lists, in news groups, or in IRC channels. Other group members could choose to respond by posting text or image.

== Brief history ==
Online discussion groups evolved from USENET, which traces back to the early 80s. Two computer scientists Jim Ellis and Tom Truscott founded the idea of setting a system of rules to produce "articles", and then send back to their parallel news group. Fundamentally, the form of discussion group was generated on the concept of USENET, which emphasised ways of communication via email and web forums. Gradually, USENET had developed to be a system of channels which provide notifications and "articles" to meet general public's needs. Nowadays, World Wide Web gradually takes on the major role of supporting and extending platforms for discussion group on the Internet by setting up various web servers.

== Small-group discussions ==
Small-group discussions, consisting of a minimum of three and maximum of about 20 people, have been found to be more effective in medical teaching.

== Overview of popular online discussion group systems ==
=== Google Groups ===
Google Groups has become one of the major online discussion groups, with a wide range of worldwide frequent users. Features include:

- the ability for anyone to create new groups and join existing groups.
- the ability to search for groups that focus on specific subject matter, as well as advanced search features that allow the search results to be filtered by date, language, and post author, among others.
- three levels of group participation: public, announcements only, and restricted.

=== Facebook groups ===
Facebook groups simplify processes and protect the privacy of users when they interact with people. Users can create a group and delegate admins. Group admins are able to make a range of adjustments to the group page, such as changing its cover photo, moderating posts and comments, and pinning posts so that they permanently appear at the top of the group page. Admins can also create group events, news updates and manage group members. By default, groups are public, and anyone can join them at the discretion of that group's admins. However, groups may be marked as private—a user may only join such a group if an existing member sends them an invitation. A single user is capable of joining a maximum of 6000 groups.

=== WhatsApp groups ===
WhatsApp is a mobile messaging app with group discussion features. Users can create group chats to facilitate group discussions. By default, all group members are admins of that group, but this may be changed at the discretion of any existing admin. Admins have the ability to rename the group, add and remove members, and delete messages that have been sent to the group.

== Advantages ==
- Advantages: the implementation of Google Groups comes with its own advantages. For diverse users, it provides the service of interpreting languages widely, which helps present a better way to communicate effectively with people in different countries. Considering of storage, one group member enjoys "100 megabytes (MB)" while there are no restrictions for the whole group. It delivers convenience for group members work on projects that need considerably more storage than normal files, for example, presentations. Studies conducted by Kushin and Kitchener indicates Facebook provide users in discussion groups with more opportunities to post content that has correlation with "social, political, or sporting issues". For WhatsApp users, the communication service brings enjoyment to share ideas with comparatively low cost. Ideally, it enhanced the quality of communication regarding of its records saving, security and trustability.
- Information in Discussion groups are usually archived. For example, Google's Groups (formerly DejaNews) is an archive of Usenet articles trace back to 1981. Discussion group archives are sometimes an effective way to find an answer to very ambiguous questions.

== Academic ==
- Small group of professionals or students formally or informally negotiate about an academic topic within certain fields. This implementation could be seen as an investigation or research based on various academic levels. For instance, "one hundred eighty college-level psychology students" breakdown into different groups to participate in giving an orderly arrangement of preferred events. Nevertheless, discussion groups could support professional services and hold events to a range of demographics; another distinguished example is from "The London Biological Mass Spectrometry Discussion Group", which sustainably operates by gathering "technicians, clinicians, academics, industrialists and students" to exchange ideas on an academic level. It attributes to the development of participants' cognitive, critical thinking, and analytical skills.

== See also ==
- Bulletin board system
- Chat room
- E learning
- Internet forum
- Social network
- User group
