= Comp.* hierarchy =

Major class of newsgroups in Usenet

The comp.* hierarchy is a major class of newsgroups in Usenet, containing all newsgroups whose name begins with "comp.", organized hierarchically. It is one of the Big 8.

comp.* groups discuss various computer, technology, and programming issues. Some groups can even offer peer-to-peer technical support.

== Partial list of comp.* groups ==
Newsgroup	Topic
comp.ai	artificial intelligence
comp.arch	computer architecture
comp.bbs	Bulletin board system system discussion and advertisement
comp.dcom.telecom	telecommunications systems
comp.dsp	Digital signal processing
comp.graphics.apps.photoshop	Adobe Photoshop, Illustrator, and InDesign.
comp.graphics.api.opengl	OpenGL
comp.infosystems.gemini	Gemini space
comp.infosystems.gopher	Gopher protocol
comp.internet.services.wiki	Wikis
comp.lang.asm.x86	assembly language for x86-based computer systems.
comp.lang.c	C programming language
comp.lang.c++	C++ programming language
comp.lang.java.help	Java programming language help
comp.lang.javascript	JavaScript programming language
comp.lang.perl.misc	Perl programming language
comp.lang.python	Python programming language
comp.os.linux.misc	Linux operating system
comp.os.minix	Minix operating system
comp.programming	Miscellaneous discussion of programming
comp.robotics.misc	All aspects of robots and their applications
comp.robotics.research	Academic, government and industry research in robotics
comp.software-eng	software engineering
comp.soft-sys.matlab	MathWorks calculation and visualization package
comp.sources.d	any computer sources
comp.sources.wanted	Requests for software and bug fixes
comp.theory	Theoretical computer science
comp.theory.cell-automata	cellular automata
comp.theory.self-org-sys	Self-organizing systems
comp.theory.dynamic-sys	Ergodic theory and dynamical systems
comp.theory.info-retrieval	Information retrieval
comp.windows.x	X window system
comp.windows.x.kde	KDE desktop environment

== Historical groups ==
Newsgroup
Topic
comp.sources.unix
Postings of public-domain sources for Unix. (Moderated)
comp.windows.news
Discussion about Sun Microsystems NeWS and PostScript related technologies.

It often got hijacked by users that weren't aware of the original purpose of the group, believing it was a newsgroup about Windows and Microsoft. This often led to flame wars between the long time users, who were upset from this situation, and the unaware users.

== See also ==
- List of newsgroups
