= Yuri Naumov =

Yuri Naumov Юрий Леонидович Наумов
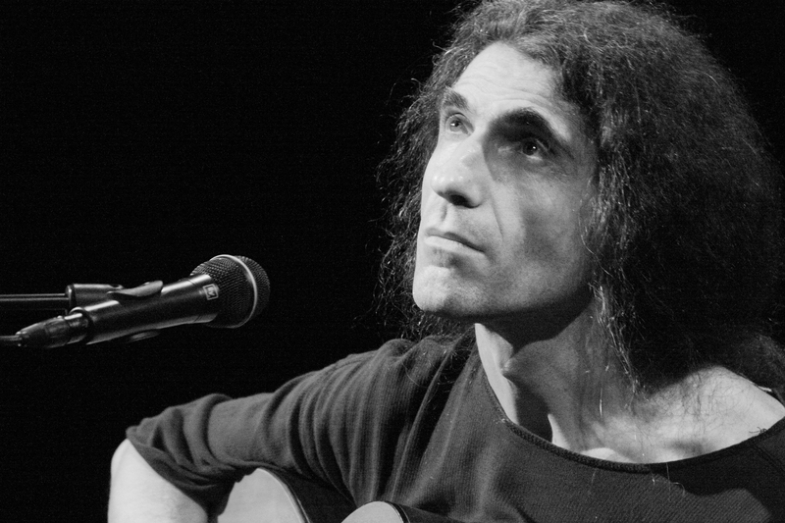
- Yuri Naumov

Background information
- Born: May 3, 1962 (age 62)
- Origin: Sverdlovsk, USSR
- Genres: Acoustic rock, blues
- Occupations: Musician (guitarist), singer-songwriter
- Instrument: Acoustic guitar
- Years active: 1983–present
- Member of: Prokhodnoy Dvor
- Website: russianblues.com

Yuri Naumov (Russian: Юрий Леонидович Наумов, born May 3, 1962, Sverdlovsk, USSR) is a poet, composer, singer and acoustic guitar player, a unique Russian bluesman.

He was born into the family of a doctor. Naumov grew up listening to bootleg records of The Beatles and Led Zeppelin and at age 8 decided to become a rock guitarist. In 1970 he with his family moved to Novosibirsk. In 1978, while playing in a school-band, he met the future members of Kalinov Most, one of Russia's most influential indie-rock bands, also one of the creators of what is called Russian blues.

In January 1983 Naumov formed a band named Prokhodnoy Dvor, the line-up of which also included Vladimir Zotov (drums) and Oleg Kurokhtin (guitars). Soon, after a bootleg released by the band became popular in the USSR, KGB forced Naumov to leave Novosibirsk Medical University for "promulgation of decadent western values," and he sought safety first in Leningrad and later in Moscow. In 1990 Naumov moved to New York City, United States.

Naumov plays a unique 9-string guitar custom-built for him by famous violin maker Sergei Nozdrin in the 1980s.

Naumov usually once or twice a year tours in Russia.

== Discography ==
- Escapist, 2019
- Rock Like Blues (Concert Film), 2008
- Russian Blues Live (Concert Album), 2006
- Born to Play (2 Discs, Live Album), 2004–2005
- Guitar Stories, 2001
- Violet Remastered, 2004 (Original release: 1996)
- Moscow Boogie (Live in Moscow), 2000 (Original Recording: April 27, 1994)
- Rolling Stone, 2003 (Original release: 1988)
- Unverifiable, 2002 (Original release: 1987)
- 1000 Day Blues (Second Digital Edition), 2002 (Original release: 1986; 1st digital reissue: 1997)

== See also ==
- Williams, LG, The Book Of Yuri (PCP Press, 2017) ISBN 1543051243
