= Sci.* hierarchy =

Major class of newsgroups in Usenet

The sci.* hierarchy is a major class of newsgroups in Usenet, containing all newsgroups whose name begins with "sci.", organized hierarchically.

sci.* groups discuss various scientific and research issues.

== List of sci.* groups ==
| Newsgroup | Topic |
| sci.aeronautics | aeronautics |
| sci.agriculture | agriculture |
| sci.answers | answers to science or scientific questions |
| sci.astro | astronomy |
| sci.bio | biology |
| sci.chem | chemistry |
| sci.cognitive | cognitive science |
| sci.cryonics | cryonics |
| sci.crypt | cryptography |
| sci.electronics | electronics |
| sci.engr | engineering |
| sci.fractals | fractals and chaos theory |
| sci.geo.earthquakes | earthquakes, volcanoes, tsunamis, and other geological and seismic events |
| sci.geo.geology | geology |
| sci.geo.meteorology | meteorology and weather phenomena |
| sci.lang | languages and linguistics |
| sci.life-extension | life extension |
| sci.logic | logic and mathematical logic |
| sci.math | mathematics |
| sci.med | medicine |
| sci.military.naval | naval science |
| sci.optics | optics and light sciences |
| sci.optics.fiber | fiber optics |
| sci.physics | physics |
| sci.physics.electromag | electromagnetic phenomena |
| sci.physics.relativity | theory of relativity |
| sci.research | scientific research |
| sci.space.policy | general spaceflight and space policy |
| sci.space.shuttle | science and engineering of the Space Shuttle |
| sci.techniques | scientific technique |

== See also ==
- List of newsgroups
