= Alt.atheism =

Usenet newsgroup that discusses atheism

alt.atheism is a Usenet newsgroup within the alt.* hierarchy that discusses atheism. The group was originally created on February 6, 1990, by a member of the alt.pagan newsgroup, to provide an alternative forum for the numerous discussions on atheism that were overwhelming the pagan group. A survey of Usenet groups in 1994–1995 found that, among 70 groups discussing "consciousness, spirituality, and religion (broadly defined)", it was the group with the highest traffic volume. Nash writes that "atheist and freethought newsgroups" including alt.atheism have "done much to remove the sense of isolation felt by many with antireligious opinions".

== Discussion matter ==
According to the alt.atheism FAQ, the purpose of the group is to discuss atheism and atheist topics such as the following:

- Whether it is reasonable to pretend to be religious in order to avoid upsetting one's family
- Prayer in schools
- Discrimination against atheists
- Sunday trading laws
- The Satanic Child Abuse myth
- Whether one should be an overt atheist or 'stay in the closet'
- How religious societies prey on new college students
- How to get rid of unwanted proselytizers
- Whether religion is a danger to society and/or the individual
- Why people become atheists

Ricker calls out another common discussion topic, the proper definition of atheism, as being "the thread that never dies on alt.atheism". The popularization of the "weak and strong atheism" terminology for different definitions of atheism has been credited to discussions on the alt.atheism newsgroup.
