= Sergey Kalugin =

Russian musician (born 1967)

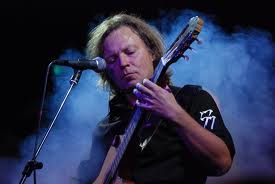
- Sergey Kalugin

Background information
- Born: April 9, 1967 (age 59)
- Origin: Moscow, USSR
- Genres: Folk rock, acoustic rock, art rock, progressive metal, classical guitar music, flamenco
- Occupations: Musician (guitarist), singer-songwriter, poet
- Instrument: Gibson Chet Atkins
- Years active: 1986–present
- Website: orgia.ru

Sergey Kalugin (Russian: Сергей Калугин; born April 9, 1967) is a Russian acoustic guitarist, singer-songwriter and poet, the leader of the Russian art/progressive rock band Orgia Pravednikov. Kalugin's guitar mastery combines classical and rock guitar trends, his music covers such different genres as progressive rock, Baroque music, flamenco; his poetics deals with such themes as Hermeticism, Kabbalah, vampirism, Christian esoterism, Gnosticism, Buddhism etc., and also includes some satirical component.

== Biography ==
Sergey Kalugin was born in Moscow, USSR, into the family of a forester, his mother being a scientist. In 1986 he completed his studies in a musical college as a classical guitarist. At about the same time he began writing poems and songs, and in 1986 he had his first public performance, due to the help of Yuri Naumov. Kalugin's initial acoustic style was reminiscent of the Soviet bards, though at the same time influenced by Russian acoustic rocker Alexander Bashlachev. Kalugin also created a heavy metal band in 1986, but this act foundered a year later without giving a single concert.

In 1989 Kalugin recorded his debut album named Путь (Path), containing his bard-like songs. However, Kalugin's dissatisfaction with his manner of playing grew; he was greatly impressed by the achievements of both his friend and competitor, Yuri Naumov, who has since been widely considered one of the best Russian acoustic rock guitarists. Yuri Naumov was the key influence that made possible Kalugin's musical breakthrough of the 1990s.

In the same year, Kalugin featured in the film Socialist City by Belgian film director and producer of Russian descent Michel Drachoussoff, and recorded his second album, also produced by Michel Drachoussoff, Moscou.

== Career ==
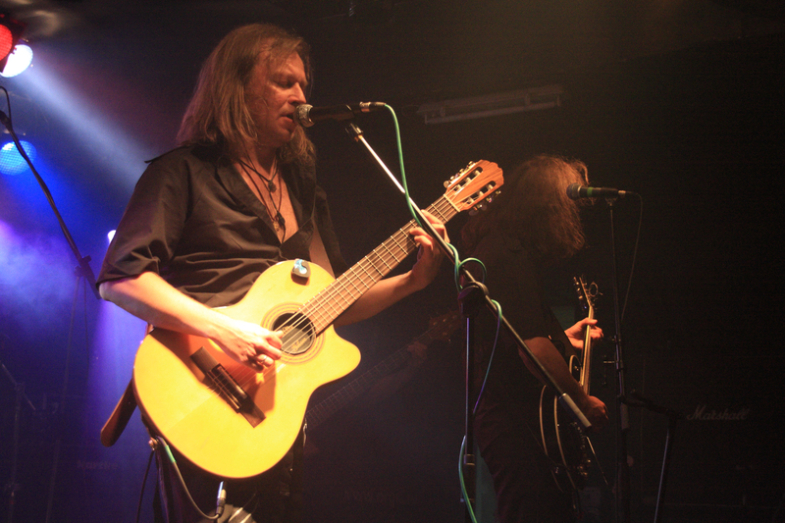
Sergey Kalugin on Saint Petersburg Orlandina club's stage on June 7, 2009

Kalugin embarked on a full-time professional musical activity in 1993. A year later he released his first successful album Nigredo featuring flamboyant complex lyrics and music, the latter unusual for both Russian bard and acoustic rock as it had been before. Due to this fact and good promotion (Kalugin and his songs from the Nigredo were featured on the Russian mainstream Radio of Russia, with its millions of listeners at the time) he became known among both Russian rock and bard audience.

In 1995 Kalugin created a precursor of the Orgia, Dikaya Okhota (Wild Hunt), which acted till 1998.

In 1999 the band Orgia Pravednikov was formed by Kalugin in association with an art rock band called Artel; Kalugin became the leader of the new act.

By 2013 the band has released eight albums. In 2013 Kalugin made it to the shortlist of the nationwide Nashe Radio's annual awards in the vocals nomination (with the band, the latest maxi-single and a song in other nominations) by poll of the audience of the radio. Sergey Kalugin with his band took part in the open-air rock festival Nashestvie 2013.

In parallel to the Orgia Pravednikov Kalugin also keeps acting as a solo performer.

== Awards ==
In 1995 the FoZ.D. foundation run by an association of well-known Moscow-based rock musicians named Sergey Kalugin Russia's Best Acoustic Guitarist 1994.

In 2013 Sergey Kalugin was nominated as a vocalist, and also a song rendered by him (though not authored), on the shortlists of the nationwide pop rock radio Nashe Radio's annual awards.

== Political views ==
In 1999 in an interview to a social-patriotic weekly Zavtra edited by Alexander Prokhanov Sergey Kalugin confessed to supporting the GKChP during the conservative 1991 August Putsch, claiming that he was the only one not afraid of coming out and walking around the Red Square (while hundreds of thousands of people were protesting against the GKChP). Later he did not express pro-Soviet views, but confessed to being a monarchist. In 2012 Sergey Kalugin expressed his support of Pussy Riot during the criminal prosecution of the Russian activist punk band. Kalugin also took part in rallies supporting the girls, an action far from typical of conservatively oriented artists in Russia.

== Discography ==
=== Solo albums ===
- 1989 – Put' (Path)
- 1989 – Moscou
- 1994 – Nigredo
- 1998 – Neslo (live, poems performed by Kalugin at a recital)
- 2006 – Rosarium (in cooperation with guitarist of the Orgia Pravednikov Alexey Burkov)
