= Wesley R. Elsberry =

Data scientist (born 1960)

- Born: January 23, 1960 (age 66); Lakeland, Florida, U.S.
- Education: University of Florida
- Known for: Criticism of intelligent design (ID)
- Scientific career
- Fields: Marine biology
- Thesis: Interrelationships Between Intranarial Pressure And Biosonar Clicks In Bottlenose Dolphins (Tursiops truncatus) (2003)

Wesley Royce Elsberry (born January 23, 1960) is a data scientist with an interdisciplinary background in marine biology, zoology, computer science, and wildlife and fisheries sciences. He also became notably involved in the defense of evolutionary science against creationist rejection of evolution.

== Early life ==
Elsberry was born in Lakeland, Florida. He was brought up in the Evangelical United Brethren church, which merged with the Methodists in 1968 to form the United Methodist Church. He attended a public elementary school, an evangelical junior high, and a Catholic high school. He received a National Merit Scholarship and earned a B.S.(Bachelor) in zoology from the University of Florida in 1982. During that period, he worked as a staff photographer for the Independent Florida Alligator newspaper.

== Career ==
After graduating from the University of Florida, he worked for Media Image Photography in Gainesville, Florida. In 1983, he became a lab technologist for the Department of Anesthesiology at the University of Florida and in 1985 became a biologist in the Department of Physiological Sciences of the College of Veterinary Medicine. He worked with Professor Richard H. Lambertsen on the histology, physiology, and epidemiology of fin whales.

He then entered a program in artificial intelligence, obtaining an M.S.C.S. in computer science from the University of Texas at Arlington in 1989. Following graduation, he was employed by General Dynamics Data Systems Division, programming fire-control computers for F-16 fighters. In 1991, he became a research scientist at the Battelle Pacific Northwest National Laboratory, working on a mapping system for the U.S. Air Force.

In 1993, he began his doctoral studies in wildlife and fisheries sciences at Texas A&M University with Professor William Eugene Evans as his major advisor. He collaborated with the U. S. Navy Marine Mammal Program in 1995 to investigate marine mammal hearing at depth. He periodically traveled to San Diego to continue collaboration on temporary threshold shift in marine mammals, until he was employed as a Behavioral Research Programmer for Science Applications International Corporation. He collaborated with Ted W. Cranford on a study of dolphin biosonar sound production in 1999. In 2001, he was awarded the Society for Marine Mammalogy's Fred Fairfield Award for Innovation in Marine Mammal Research. He completed his Ph.D. in 2003.

Elsberry was a visiting researcher at Michigan State University from 2007 to 2009. There, he worked on the Avida artificial life project and extended the Avida-Ed software system.

== Creationism ==
Elsberry became interested in the political controversy between creationism and science in February 1986, when he attended a lecture by a Young-Earth Creationist geologist. He found it superficially convincing and the lecturer gave him a copy of The Scientific Case for Creation by Henry M. Morris. Elsberry later recalled; "As I read that book, I started highlighting things that were pretty obviously counterfactual", and by 1987 only about five pages lacked highlighting. He said "I was just appalled at what I was reading. I came to believe that to stand by and not say anything about what he was doing to science and to religion would have made me complicit in that." Using his knowledge of biology and computer science, Elsberry became heavily involved in online discussions on the topic.

He took up criticizing antievolution claims in letters to the editors of newspapers and in online forums. His stance in these matters has been one of theistic evolution, with the concern that science be taught in science classes, and non-science be taught elsewhere. He participated in Fidonet echoes, particularly the Science Echo, from 1988 to 1994. In 1989, he began operating his own BBS, first as an RBBS-Net node and later as a Fidonet node. He started the Neural-Net Echo in 1989, and the Evolution Echo in 1991. He became a participant in the Usenet talk.origins newsgroup in 1991. By 1995, he had contributed a FAQ on punctuated equilibria to the TalkOrigins Archive, as well as the Jargon and Biographica compilations. He also created his own set of web pages dealing with scientific creationism in 1995.

In 1997, he presented at the "Naturalism, Theism, and the Scientific Enterprise" conference held by intelligent design advocates in Austin, Texas, giving a defense of methodological naturalism. He also assisted the National Center for Science Education (NCSE) that year with regard to the review of science textbooks undertaken by the state of Texas.

In 2001, he presented opposite William A. Dembski at the Center for Theology and the Natural Sciences/American Association for the Advancement of Science "Interpreting Evolution" conference at Haverford College, Haverford, Pennsylvania. Brett Vickers turned over care and maintenance of the TalkOrigins Archive to him late in 2001. He established a group of about a dozen volunteers, the TalkOrigins Archive Delegation, to handle needed maintenance and updates of the site. He also established the Antievolution.org site in 2001 as a place to collect critical information on the antievolution movement. In 2002, he presented at the "Evolution and Intelligent Design" session of the CSICOP 4th World Skeptics conference in Burbank, California, along with Massimo Pigliucci, Kenneth Miller, Paul Nelson, and William A. Dembski.

In 2003, he took the position of Information Project Director at NCSE.

In 2004, he helped establish the Panda's Thumb weblog and founded The Austringer.

== The Austringer ==
The Austringer is the personal blog of Elsberry, initiated during a 2004 hospitalization as a convenient way to keep friends and family updated on developments. The title derives from falconry jargon for a person who flies a short-wing hawk. While posts cover falconry, science, wildlife, computation, and media issues, the most notable posts concern science education and the antievolution movement. These have included substantial materials concerning Discovery Institute intelligent design campaigns, the Sternberg peer review controversy, and Expelled: No Intelligence Allowed.

This blog has figured significantly in the ongoing defense of science against anti-evolutionism. For example, The Austringer is a major contributor to the Florida school science curricula debate.

== Awards ==
- 2001: Society for Marine Mammalogy's Fairfield Memorial Award for Innovation in Marine Mammal Research
- 2003: National Center for Science Education's Friend of Darwin Award
