= Alt.* hierarchy =

Subclass of Usenet newsgroups

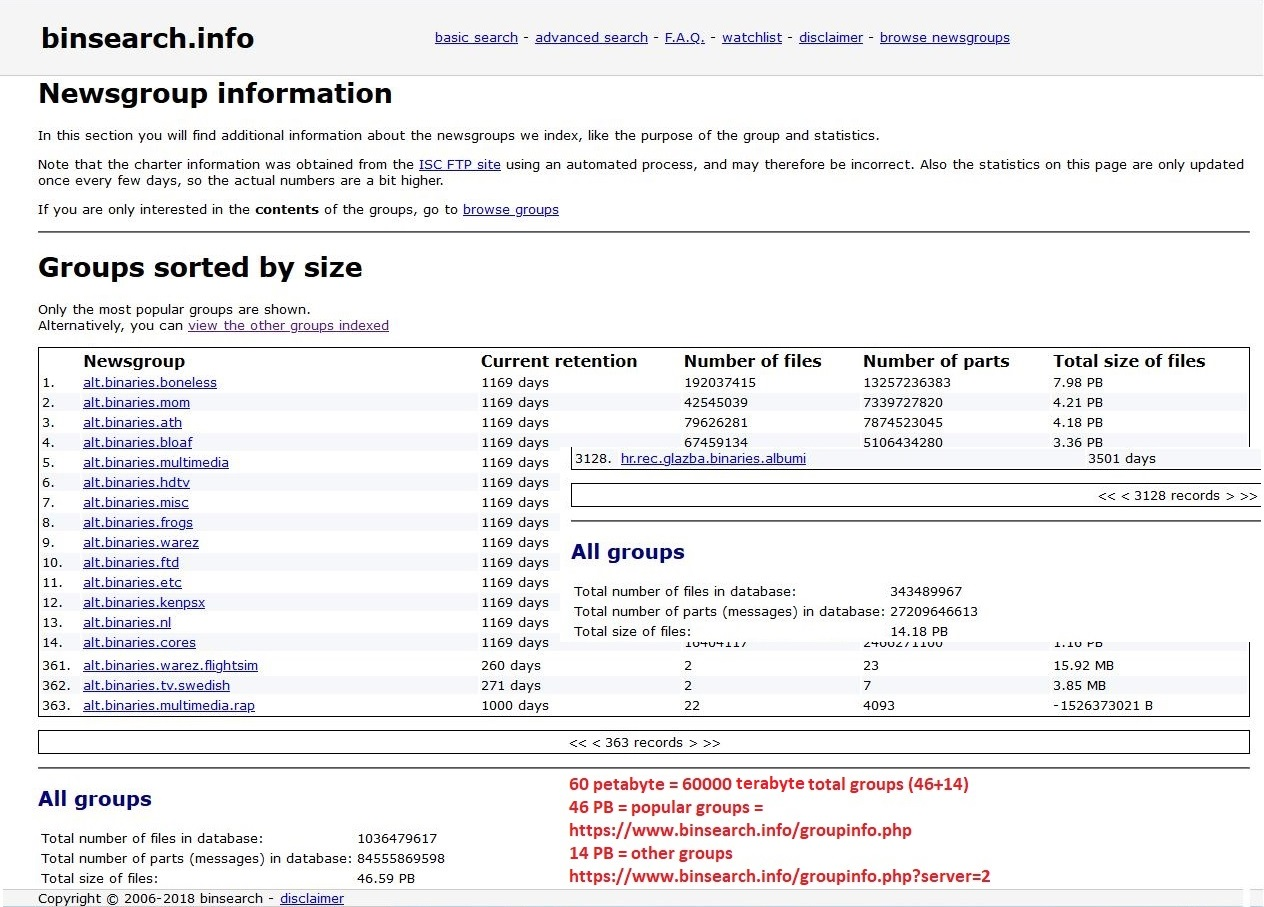
October 2020 screenshot showing 60 PB of usenet group data.

The alt.* hierarchy is a major class of newsgroups in Usenet, containing all newsgroups whose name begins with "alt.", organized hierarchically. The alt.* hierarchy is not confined to newsgroups of any specific subject or type, although in practice more formally organized groups tend not to occur in alt.*. The alt.* hierarchy was created by John Gilmore and Brian Reid.

Unlike most of the other hierarchies, there is no centralized control of the hierarchy and anyone who is technically capable of creating a newsgroup can do so. In practice, however, most newsgroups follow an informal procedure involving a public discussion in alt.config before being created. This procedure is designed to help the potential creator better understand what factors contribute to a newsgroup's success.

It is up to each individual news administrator whether to add a new newsgroup, and some will not do so if the group has not been discussed in alt.config. As a result, groups that do not follow this procedure are usually not well-propagated. News group removal in theory occurs in much the same way as newsgroup creation, however as a matter of practice most news administrators do not remove newsgroups.

== Origin ==
The birth of the alt.* hierarchy is tied to a drastic transformation of the Usenet, the Great Renaming of 1987. The "backbone carriers", or the backbone cabal as they have been referred to by some users of the Usenet, were vital hubs in the distribution chain of most of the newsgroup postings. Their effort to change the way newsgroups are organized led to objections from some vocal Usenet users.

In particular, the creation of the talk.* hierarchy for discussions of controversial or sensitive issues by the renaming did not go well. The alt.* hierarchy was suggested as an alternative to talk.* by Brian Reid. It would be a network without the backbones, thereby free from backbones' influences on creating or not creating a new newsgroup. The first newsgroup on the alt.* hierarchy was his alt.gourmand.

The prefix "alt" refers to the fact that it is a "hierarchy that is 'alternative' to the 'mainstream' (comp, misc, news, rec, soc, sci and talk) hierarchies". The "So You Want to Create an Alt Newsgroup" FAQ repeats a common joke that the name "alt" is an acronym for "Anarchists, Lunatics, and Terrorists".

Alt has since become home for a wide variety of things that did not fit elsewhere. In particular, there are many alt.fan newsgroups, mostly devoted to discussions of the work and life of famous people: writers, musicians, actors and athletes have alt.fan groups. This sub-hierarchy has also been used for self-promotion by otherwise unknown people. During the notorious trial of Karla Homolka, alt.fan.karla-homolka was created to get around the Canadian news blackout on the case.

Two major sections of the alt.* hierarchy, the alt.sex.* and alt.binaries.* hierarchies, have been found to fit better in the alt.* hierarchy than the Big-eight. Because of the inevitably lurid and sometimes offensive subjects that it would cover, newsgroup administrators objected to the inclusion of one or more newsgroups covering sexual topics in the Big Seven (including the existing rec.arts.erotica), fearing that they may prevent the major news hierarchies from being widely distributed. News administrators are free to add any or all of the alt.sex.* newsgroups without having to worry about conflicting with the Big Seven. Likewise, any and all of the alt.binaries.* newsgroups can be accepted or rejected by administrators if they choose. Binaries are often of extremely large size, which is why administrators may choose to exclude them.

Several extensions of the alt.* hierarchy have become quite successful on their own. A number of newsgroups have taken advantage of the freedom of the alt.* hierarchy to create a number of newsgroups that specialize on certain topics, as opposed to the broader "generic" discussions of the Big Seven hierarchy. For instance, the rec.* hierarchy may be home to the movie discussion newsgroups rec.arts.movies.current-films, rec.arts.movies.past-films, and rec.arts.movies.reviews; but the alt.movies.* hierarchy contains more focused discussion groups including alt.movies.silent, alt.movies.hitchcock, alt.movies.kubrick, and alt.movies.visual-effects.

The language of preference in the "original" Usenet hierarchies, including alt.*, is English, which implies that the preferred character set encoding for these newsgroups is ASCII. Other language hierarchies have later been created in parallel to the existing English ones, for example de.* for German, fr.* for French, etc. Some access providers also created their own versions, prefixing the newsgroups names with their own name in a similar way. Messages posted in these "private" groups are generally not passed to other providers or the internet in general.

== Censorship ==
In June 2008, it was announced that Sprint and Verizon would be cutting off access to the alt.* hierarchy to their subscribers, citing child pornography as the only reason. New York State Attorney General Andrew Cuomo claimed his office found child porn in 88 of the 100,000 groups that exist on alt.*. Verizon has not blocked alt.* from users, but has simply stopped maintaining the alt.* hierarchy on their own servers. Verizon subscribers can still access the alt.* hierarchy through a third-party Usenet service.

In the same time frame, AT&T's United States–based consumer dial internet service provider decommissioned their NNTP servers entirely, citing a combination of the above concerns and a putative decline in traffic volume which had accelerated beyond a statistical point of no return.

== See also ==
- List of newsgroups
