= Talk.origins =

Usenet discussion forum concerning evolution and the origin of life

talk.origins (often capitalised to Talk.Origins or abbreviated as t.o.) is a Usenet discussion forum concerning the origins of life, and evolution. Its official purpose is to draw such debates out of the science newsgroups, such as sci.bio.evolution and sci.bio.paleontology. With the general decline of evolution/creationism debate and discontinuation of Google Groups support for Usenet in February 2024, Talk.Origins is now largely defunct.

== History ==
The first post to talk.origins was a starter post by Mary Horton, dated 5 September 1986.

In the early 1990s, a number of FAQs on various topics were being periodically posted to the newsgroup. In 1994, Brett J. Vickers established an anonymous FTP site to host the collected FAQs of the newsgroup. In 1995, Vickers started the TalkOrigins Archive web site as another means of hosting the talk.origins FAQs. It maintains an extensive FAQ on topics in evolutionary biology, geology and astronomy, with the aim of representing the views of mainstream science. It has spawned other websites, notably TalkDesign "a response to the intelligent design movement", Evowiki, and the Panda's Thumb weblog.

The group was originally created as the unmoderated newsgroup net.origins as a 'dumping ground' for all the various flame threads 'polluting' other newsgroups, then renamed to talk.origins as part of the Great Renaming. Subsequently, after discussion on the newsgroup, the group was voted to be moderated in 1997 by the normal USENET RFD/CFV process, in which only spam and excessive crossposting are censored. The moderator for the newsgroup is David Iain Greig (and technically Jim Lippard as alternate/backup).

== Culture ==
The group is characterized by a long list of in-crowd jokes like the fictitious University of Ediacara, the equally fictitious Evil Atheist Conspiracy which allegedly hides all the evidence supporting Creationism, a monthly election of the Chez Watt-award for "statements that make you go 'say what', or some such", pun cascades, a strong predisposition to quoting Monty Python, and a habit of calling penguins "the best birds".

Apart from the humor, the group includes rebuttals to creationist claims. There is an expectation that any claim is to be backed up by actual evidence, preferably in the form of a peer-reviewed publication in a reputable journal. The group as a whole votes for a PoTM-award (Post of The Month), which makes it into the annals of TalkOrigins Archive.

== See also ==
- National Center for Science Education (NCSE)
- TalkOrigins Archive
