= Orgia Pravednikov =

Russian rock group

- Origin: Moscow, Russia
- Genres: Hard rock, progressive rock, art rock, progressive metal
- Members: Sergey Kalugin; Alexei Burkov; Yuri Ruslanov; Artemiy Bondarenko; Alexander Vetkhov
- Website: www.orgia.ru

Orgia Pravednikov (Russian: Оргия Праведников, lit. 'Orgy of The Righteous') is a Russian rock group formed in 1999. The peculiar sound of the band arises from a combination of acoustic (flute and acoustic guitar) and electric (drums, electric guitar and bass guitar) sessions.

== History ==
Orgia Pravednikov was formed in early 1999 by a merge of the rock group Artel, whose style can be described as art-rock, and singer-songwriter and acoustic guitarist Sergey Kalugin, who had just had his previous act Dikaya Okhota ('Wild Hunt') disbanded.

According to the members of the band, the name Orgia Pravednikov was prompted by the audience asked what the band should be called during a concert. Soon after the forming the band released an eponymous single, and in 2001 an album Oglaschennye, isydite!. Over the decade, 2001–2010, the band output four studio albums.

The start of the second decade was marked by the band being aired on the major national pop-rock radio Nashe Radio. In 2013, Orgia Pravednikov made it to the shortlist of the radio's annual awards, including a song, an album and the vocalist (Kalugin) in respective nominations, though eventually the band did not win any award, as determined by audience poll results.

== Members ==
- Sergey Kalugin — lyrics, acoustic guitar, vocals
- Alexei Burkov — lead guitar
- Artemiy Bondarenko — bass
- Alexander Vetkhov — drums

=== Former members ===
- Yuri Ruslanov — flutes, keyboard

== Discography ==
=== Studio albums ===
- 2001 — Oglaschennie, isydite! (Russian: Оглашенные, изыдите! (Catechumen, depart!)).
- 2005 — Dveri! Dveri! (Russian: Двери! Двери! (The doors! The doors!)).
- 2007 — Uhodiashee solntse (Russian: Уходящее солнце (The Fading Sun)).
- 2010 — Dlya teh, kto vidit sny (Russian: Для тех, кто видит сны (For those who dream)).
- 2012 — Shitrock (Russian: Шитрок).
- 2016 — Dlya teh, kto vidit sny. Vol. 2 (Russian: Для тех, кто видит сны (For those who dream. Vol. 2)).

=== Live albums ===
- 2004 — Korablik, CD (Russian: Кораблик, translated as Shiplet)
- 2006 — Brat' zhiv'em, DVD (Russian: Брать живьём, translated as Take Alive)
- 2008 — Solntsestoyanie, double DVD (Russian: Солнцестояние, translated as Solstice)
- 2010 — 10 let OP, DVD (Russian: 10 лет ОП, translated as 10 years of OP)
- 2014 — Vperyod i vverkh, DVD and double CD (Russian: Вперёд и вверх, translated as Forward and upward)
- 2018 — #juststudio, DVD and CD

=== Singles ===
- 2000 — "Orgia Pravednikov" (Russian: "Оргия Праведников", translated as "Orgy of The Righteous")
- 2003 — "Poslednii Voin Mertvoi Zemli" (Russian: "Последний Воин Мёртвой Земли", translated as "The Last Warrior of the Dead Land")
- 2009 — "Nasha Rodina — SSSR" (Russian: "Наша Родина — СССР", translated as "Our Motherland is the USSR")
- 2013 — "Russkii Extrim" (Russian: "Русский Экстрим", translated as "Russian Extreme")
- 2014 — "Vdal' po sinei vode" (Russian: "Вдаль по синей воде", translated as "Far down the blue water")
- 2014 — "S.M.S." (Russian: "С.М.С. (Станция Мёртвых Сердец)", translated as "The Station of Dead Hearts")
- 2020 — "Vremya Budit' Korolei" (Russian: "Время Будить Королей", translated as "Time to Wake Up Kings")
