= Backbone cabal =

Group of administrators on Usenet

The backbone cabal was an informal organization of large-site news server administrators of the worldwide distributed newsgroup-based discussion system Usenet. It existed from about 1983 until around 1988.

The cabal was created as an effort to facilitate reliable propagation of new Usenet posts. While in the 1970s and 1980s many news servers only operated during nighttime to save on the cost of long-distance communication, servers of the backbone cabal were available 24 hours a day. The administrators of these servers gained sufficient influence in the otherwise anarchic Usenet community to be able to push through controversial changes, for instance the Great Renaming of Usenet newsgroups during 1987.

== History ==
Mary Ann Horton recruited membership in and designed the original physical topology of the Usenet Backbone in 1983. Gene "Spaf" Spafford then created an email list of the backbone administrators, plus a few influential posters. This list became known as the Backbone Cabal and served as a "political (i.e. decision making) backbone". Other prominent members of the cabal were Brian Reid, Richard Sexton, Chuq von Rospach and Rick Adams.

== In internet culture ==
During most of its existence, the cabal (sometimes capitalized) steadfastly denied its own existence; those involved would often respond "There is no Cabal" (sometimes abbreviated as "TINC"').

The result of this policy was an aura of mystery, even a decade after the cabal mailing list disbanded in late 1988 following an internal fight.
