= The Panda's Thumb (blog) =

Science communication blog

The Panda's Thumb is a blog on issues of creationism and evolution from a mainstream scientific perspective. In 2006, Nature listed it as one of the top five science blogs, and Mark Pallen has called it "the definitive blog on the evolution versus creationism debate".

It is written by multiple contributors, including Wesley R. Elsberry, Joe Felsenstein, Paul R. Gross, Nick Matzke, and Mark Perakh, many of whom used to have complementary blogs at ScienceBlogs before it went defunct. The blog takes its name from The Panda's Thumb, the pub of the virtual University of Ediacara, which is named after the book of the same name by Stephen Jay Gould, which in turn takes its title from the essay "The Panda's Peculiar Thumb", which discusses the Panda's sesamoid bone, an example of convergent evolution.

== See also ==
- Rejection of evolution by religious groups
