= Great Renaming =

Restructuring of Usenet newsgroups in 1987

The Great Renaming was a restructuring of Usenet newsgroups that took place in 1987. B News maintainer and UUNET founder Rick Adams is generally considered to be the initiator of the Renaming.

== Motivation ==
The primary reason for the Great Renaming was said to be the difficulty of maintaining a list of all the existing groups.

An alternative explanation was that European networks refused to pay for some of the high-volume and low-content groups such as those regarding religion and racism; this resulted in a need for categorization of all such newsgroups. The suggested category for the newsgroups less popular among European networks was talk.*.

== History ==
=== Pre-renaming ===
Before the Renaming, the newsgroups were categorized into three hierarchies: fa.* for groups gatewayed from ARPANET, mod.* for moderated discussions, and net.* for unmoderated groups. Names of the groups were said to be rather haphazard.

While reorganization discussions had occurred earlier, software limitations prevented the adoption of a consistent organizational scheme. Improvements introduced by Adams during 1986 with B News version 2.11 removed the requirement for moderated groups to use the "mod." prefix, allowed posting to moderated groups using newsreaders rather than separate e-mail programs, and eliminated the flat storage method, which required that the first 14 characters of all newsgroups be unique. With this added flexibility and transparency, it became practical to perform the effort.

=== Renaming ===
The backbone providers, called the backbone cabal, were instrumental in this reorganization of Usenet since they had great influence with respect to supporting a new newsgroup. Some suggest that members of the cabal had interests in bundling certain newsgroups into the talk.* hierarchy, so that they would not be objected to by their supervisors.

These newsgroups were categorized into a series of hierarchies, to make it easier for newsgroups to be created and distributed. The original hierarchies were comp.*, misc.*, news.*, rec.*, sci.*, soc.*, and talk.*.

These hierarchies, known collectively as the "Big Seven", were open and free for anyone to participate in (except for the moderated newsgroups), though they were subject to a few general rules governing their naming and distribution.

Several other popular hierarchies remained on Usenet as well, such as the k12.* hierarchy, which covers topics especially relating to education, schools, and colleges.

=== Post-renaming ===
An additional hierarchy, alt.*, was also created soon after the Renaming. The alt.* hierarchy was meant to be completely free from centralized control, and it was not subject to the formalities of the Big Seven.

The prefix "alt" designated a hierarchy that is alternative to the mainstream (comp, misc, news, rec, soc, sci, talk) hierarchies. As free form discussion on alt.* contrasted with the more academic tending formal hierarchies, the "So You Want to Create an Alt Newsgroup" FAQ jokes that the name "alt" is an acronym for "anarchists, lunatics, and terrorists", though this is actually just a humorous backronym.

In April 1995, when Usenet traffic grew significantly, particularly in academia, the humanities.* hierarchy was introduced to better cover the additional kinds of topics being discussed, and with the seven hierarchies created by the Renaming, compose today's so-called "Big 8".
