= Crossposting =

Act of posting the same message to multiple information channels

Crossposting, also known as x-posting or xposting, is the act of posting one message to multiple information channels; forums, mailing lists, or newsgroups. This is distinct from multiposting, which is the posting of separate identical messages, individually, to each channel (a forum, a newsgroup, an email list, or topic area). Enforcement actions against crossposting individuals vary from simple admonishments up to total lifetime bans. In some cases, on email lists and forums, an individual is put under a stealth ban where their posts are distributed back to them as if they were being distributed normally, but the rest of the subscribers are not sent the messages. This is easily detected if the Stealthed individual has two different, and totally non-associated identities in the channel, such that the non-stealthed identity will see a different set of messages, lacking the posts of the stealthed individual, in their view of the channel.

Crossposting to groups that are irrelevant to the message posted could be considered spamming. Moreover, excessive crossposting is generally considered bad form because it multiplies traffic without adding any new content. In the extreme case, if all messages were crossposted to every email list or forum, then every email list or group would look exactly the same. A crossposter can minimize this problem by specifying that all responses be directed to a single group.

== Crossposting in Usenet ==
In Usenet, the destination newsgroup(s) for a particular message is indicated in the "Newsgroups:" line. Most commonly, just one newsgroup is specified. For example;

Newsgroups: sci.space

However, it is possible to specify that the message is intended for more than one newsgroup.

Newsgroups: sci.space,comp.simulation

In this case, the message will be visible both in the sci.space and comp.simulation newsgroups. Despite appearing in two separate places, only one message has been posted. This has several advantages.

- A crossposted message takes up less server storage space, and creates less network traffic, than if individual messages had been posted to multiple newsgroups.
- Usenet reader software can intelligently track whether or not the user has already viewed the message in one newsgroup, even though they might currently be looking at another newsgroup. If multiple individual messages had been posted (i.e. the message's content was multiposted), each would appear to be a new unread message in each newsgroup.
- Replies to crossposted messages will be, by default, also crossposted, and so conversations can occur between readers of the multiple newsgroups without any confusion, so long as nobody "breaks the thread" by changing the groups they post their reply to. This enables readers of one of the newsgroups in the crosspost to provide corrections, etc. to information posted by somebody in a different newsgroup. By adding a "Followup-To:" line a poster can indicate that answers to his post should be posted to another set of newsgroups than those listed by the "Newsgroups:" line.
- It avoids the fragmentation of replies which tends to occur with multiposted messages. It helps to avoid time wasted on writing a reply which has, in essence, been posted on another newsgroup but which the replier has not seen because they do not read that newsgroup or have not yet looked there.

Crossposting is usually practiced when material is relevant and of interest to the readers of more than one newsgroup. However, sometimes it is used maliciously to begin a thread between newsgroups whose readers are likely to have violently differing opinions, in the hope of provoking a conflict. This is a form of trolling.

Crossposting to more than a small number of newsgroups is likely to be counterproductive. A commonly suggested limit is three newsgroups.

Some NNTP servers drop posts which are crossposted to more than a set number of newsgroups, especially if no "Followup-To:" line exists.

== Crossposting on Reddit ==
On Reddit, users may crosspost from one subreddit to another, as long as they are a member of the target subreddit and it allows crossposting. A crosspost includes an embed of the original post, but also has its own score and comments section.
