= FAQ =

Answers to common questions on a topic

A FAQ is a curated list of questions and answers designed to address aspects of a topic that are important, often unknown or misunderstood. It is an acronym that expands to "frequently asked question" or "frequently asked questions". While either expansion implies that questions are often asked, they generally are not. FAQ is more about the question-answer format and an indication of the relevance of the content. Each question may be conglomerated from multiple real questions, what an author anticipates a reader will wonder about, or is simply a way of organizing information.

Although FAQ is commonly used and understood, the term has several grammatical ambiguities:

Two pronunciations
The pronunciation is either as a word (fack) or as each letter (F-A-Q). As such, the indefinite article used is either "a" for the former or "an" for the latter. As both pronunciations are correct, either article is correct.
Two expansions
Oddly for an acronym, it can expand to either of two phrases. The plural form (questions) is the more commonly used, yet the singular (question) is also used.
Usually a list
A common use of FAQ is to refer to a list of question-answer pairs. In this sense, the term is singular (a list), yet the expansion is plural (multiple questions).
Plural form
The term "FAQs" generally refers to multiple FAQ lists. But, if the implied expansion is singular (question), then FAQs could mean multiple questions.

== Q&A ==
Although the term FAQ is relatively recent, its format is the same as the older format Q&A: question and answer. For example, Matthew Hopkins wrote The Discovery of Witches in 1648 as a list of questions and answers, introduced as "Certaine Queries answered ...". Many old catechisms are in a Q&A format. Summa Theologica, written by Thomas Aquinas in the second half of the 13th century, is a series of common questions about Christianity to which he wrote a series of replies.

FAQ originated as an Internet tradition in the early 1980s, driven by the limitations of early computer networks and mailing lists. The first FAQ was developed in 1982, several years before the World Wide Web, when digital storage was expensive and network resources were limited. On ARPANET's SPACE mailing list, it was assumed that new users would download and read archived messages via FTP before participating. In practice, however, many users did not consult the archives and instead posted questions that had already been answered. Repeatedly providing the same answers became tedious and was seen as contrary to emerging norms of netiquette.

To address this problem, computer system administrators and mailing-list participants introduced various methods for distributing commonly needed information, including regularly posted messages and automated email query systems. Between 1982 and 1985, Eugene Miya of NASA coined the acronym FAQ for use on the SPACE mailing list. The format was subsequently adopted by other mailing lists and Usenet newsgroups. FAQs were initially posted at monthly intervals, but some communities later increased their frequency to weekly or even daily postings. Jef Poskanzer is credited with posting the first weekly FAQ on the Usenet net.graphics and comp.graphics newsgroups, while Eugene Miya experimented with the first daily FAQ.

As FAQs accumulated across Usenet, they contributed to the creation of the moderated "*.answers" newsgroups, including comp.answers, misc.answers, and sci.answers. These groups were established to collect and cross-post FAQs from the various comp.*, misc.*, and sci.* newsgroups, making commonly requested information more accessible to users.

== On the web ==
FAQ is included in some websites. As part of web design, FAQ can help achieve customer service and search engine optimization (SEO) goals, including reducing the workload of in-person customer service employees, improving site navigation, increasing the website's visibility by matching/optimizing specific keywords, and linking to or integrating with product pages.

Additionally, FAQ sections can enhance user experience by offering immediate, self-service answers to common questions, leading to faster resolution of inquiries and increased user satisfaction. By structuring FAQ content with clear headings and relevant keywords, websites can further improve SEO rankings and drive organic traffic. Tools like FAQPage.com help optimize FAQ content by providing schema markup and other technical enhancements, ensuring that FAQ pages are better indexed by search engines, which can result in richer search results and more visibility for the website.

Researchers have also investigated automating the creation of FAQ content itself, for example by applying text mining and topic modeling techniques to mailing lists and Internet forums to semi-automatically extract candidate question-and-answer pairs for software development FAQs.

== Non-traditional ==
In some cases, non-traditional FAQ-style informative documents are billed as FAQs, particularly in the video game field, which often contain detailed descriptions of gameplay, including tips, secrets, and beginning-to-end guidance. Video game FAQs are rarely in a question-and-answer format, although they may include a short question-and-answer section.

== Criticism ==
Some content providers discourage the use of FAQs in place of restructuring content under logical headings. For example, the UK Government Digital Service does not use FAQs because the service believes that its format primarily serves the needs of writers and creates more work for readers.
