= News.admin.net-abuse.email =

Usenet newsgroup

news.admin.net-abuse.email (sometimes abbreviated nanae or n.a.n-a.e, and often incorrectly spelled with a hyphen in "email") is a Usenet newsgroup devoted to discussion of the abuse of email systems, specifically through email spam and similar attacks. According to a timeline compiled by Keith Lynch, news.admin.net-abuse.email was the first widely available electronic forum for discussing spam.

Steve Linford, the founder of The Spamhaus Project, sometimes posts in the newsgroup.

== Topics covered ==
In its original charter the following examples of "on-topic" areas were listed:

- Chain letters
- DoS attacks
- Email address list
- Email bomb
- Email viruses
- Filtering software
- Large-scale mailings
- Listserv bombs
- Mailing list abuse
- Pyramid schemes
- Unsolicited email

Eventually, by mutual consent, it was also determined that the following were also "on-topic":

- Cats (on a superficial/anecdotal level)

== History ==
The group was officially proposed (i.e. its RFD posted) by Tim Skirvin (tskirvin) on July 9, 1996 alongside a number of other groups in order to reduce the load on the two net abuse groups at that time, news.admin.net-abuse.announce and news.admin.net-abuse.misc.

Later that month it went to vote and passed 451 to 28.

In September 2002 it was proposed that a subgroup, news.admin.net-abuse.email.blocklists, be created.

== NANAEisms ==
Over time, some (more or less) NANAE-specific terms were coined:

404-compliant
A website that has been terminated by its hosting provider for terms of service violation is said to be "404-compliant", a reference to the 404 "not found" status code in HTTP and a parody of spammers claiming their spam is 301 compliant, referring to a bill that never made it into a law.
Auto-ignore
The automated response from an Internet service provider's (ISP's) abuse desk, when it is believed that sending out the automated response is the only action the ISP will take.
Black hat
An ISP that enables spamming, for example a hosting provider that does not act upon spam complaints. Named after old westerns where the bad guys often wore black hats. Compare white hat and gray hat.
Bulletproof
Said when it's difficult to get an ISP to take action against spamming customers.
Cartooney
A derisive portmanteau of the words cartoon and attorney, used to refer to a hollow lawsuit threat with which a spammer tries to intimidate an anti-spammer. This term may also refer to the spammer's lawyer (who is usually assumed not to exist). The majority of such hollow legal threats arise in the context of a listed entity threatening a blacklist maintainer with legal action.
Cats and Coffee warning
A Cats and Coffee warning or C&C warning is a satirical warning that a usenet posting or other writing may contain humorous material. The C&C warning originated with the usenet group news.admin.net-abuse.email, but has spread to other groups. The warning is an admonition to the reader to secure liquid beverages (particularly hot ones) and cats in case uncontrollable laughter breaks out upon reading the article.
Chew toy
From time to time, a spammer surfaces in the group, typically ranting about how spam control activities, such as blacklisting, amount to censorship and violate that spammer's right to free speech. These visiting spammers are referred to as chew toys (because of the slight entertainment value their tirades provide). The same chew toy may frequent the group for several years. There may not always be a chew toy active, and very seldom have there been more than one concurrently.
Chickenboner
A derisive term used to refer to minor or amateur spammer. Named after a colorful and humorous description one newsgroup participant made of spammers living in trailers and eating at Kentucky Fried Chicken.
Cut it out, Ron
A standard response to a posting that is suspected to be a troll. Named after a regular poster who often wrote humorous troll posts.
Frea speach
Spammers claim the right to distribute unsolicited bulk mail as part of their right to free speech under the United States Constitution. After one such person repeatedly misspelled it as "frea speach", newsgroup participants who argued that the right to free speech refers to the right to not be censored by the U.S. government and nothing to do with the right to employ the services of private individuals and organizations to distribute bulk mail, took to referring to this claimed right as "frea speach", deliberately mis-spelling it partly as a parody and partly to distinguish it from actual free speech rights.
Gray hat
An ISP whose stance in spam matters is somewhat ambiguous. It may terminate some spamming customers but not all of them. Compare black hat and white hat.
Hat check
A request to determine the reputation of a given ISP in spam matters. See also black-, gray- and white hat.
Joe job
The act of sending out spam made to look like it came from a person or organization which the spammer dislikes. Spamhaus, SpamCop and other anti-spam organizations are often the victims of these, as are some individual anti-spammers. Being Joe-jobbed is usually taken as a sign that the victim must have really hurt some spammer.
LART
A meme which jokingly refers to a fictitious hypothetical blunt instrument (i.e. a " Luser Attitude Readjustment Tool") whose primary and/or singular use and purpose is the metaphorically application or introduction of understanding (typically of Internet norms and conventions, but of any concept whatsoever) to a person currently lacking such understanding. Large mallets and anvils are popularly referred to as examples of items or tools which would be useful as LARTs.
Listwashing
The act of responding to complaints by removing the complainer's email address from the spammer's list, without taking any further actions against the spammer.
Lumber Cartel
A tongue-in-cheeck conspiracy theory that claimed anti-spammers were secretly paid agents of lumber companies.
Luser
A portmanteau word combining loser and user.
Mainsleaze
Spam coming from a notable or well-known ("mainstream") company.
Netscum
A list of anti-spam activists published by Sanford Wallace (also known as Spamford Wallace).
Pink contract
A contract for internet services or hosting that makes it difficult to impossible to terminate the contract for spamming.
Quirk Objection
'Objection! Assumes X not found in evidence!' A humorous objection, raised when the previous poster assumes the presence of something that has not yet been proven to exist. Not used to refer to things that have definitely been proven not to exist. Named after the regular poster 'Captain Gym Z. Quirk' who first raised this. Often shortened to ObQuirk!
Sock
A poster who is suspected to be someone else (usually a spammer) using a new name. Shortened from Sock Puppet.
Spamhaus
Originally, this term was used as a derogatory epithet to refer to any individual ISP that had mostly or only spammers for customers. Nowadays, it more often refers to the anti-spam organization of the same name.
Spamware
Software that was written explicitly for the purpose of spamming, or has features that are mostly or only useful to spammers and other abusers. Also called 'ratware'.
TINLC
There is no Lumber Cartel
TINW
There is no We. The poster recognizes that NANAE does not have a collective opinion.
Whack-a-Mole
The act of repeatedly causing spammers' throwaway accounts and drop boxes to be terminated. Named after the Whac-A-Mole arcade game.
White hat
An ISP which takes spam complaints seriously and terminates offenders swiftly and with extreme prejudice. Named after old westerns where the good guys usually wore white hats. Compare black hat and gray hat.
