= There Is No Cabal =

Usenet catchphrase and running joke

There Is No Cabal symbol

There Is No Cabal (abbreviated TINC) is a catchphrase and running joke found on Usenet. The journalist Wendy M. Grossman writes that its appearance on the alt.usenet.cabal FAQ reflects conspiracy accusations as old as the Internet itself. The anthropologist Gabriella Coleman writes that the joke reveals "discomfort over the potential for corruption by meritocratic leaders".

== History ==
The phrase There Is No Cabal was developed to deny the existence of the backbone cabal, which members of the cabal denied. The cabal consisted of operators of major news server newsgroups, allowing them to wield greater control over Usenet. This acronym spawned the later There Is No Lumber Cartel (TINLC) and There Is No We (TINW) in the news.admin.net-abuse.* newsgroups, especially news.admin.net-abuse.email.

== See also ==
- Backbone cabal
- Cabal
- Internet meme
- Lumber Cartel
- Wikipedia:Cabals
- Wikipedia:TINC
