= Lumber Cartel =

Facetious conspiracy theory popularized on USENET

The Lumber Cartel was a facetious conspiracy theory popularized on USENET that claimed anti-spammers were secretly paid agents of lumber companies.

In November 1997, a participant on news.admin.net-abuse.email posted an essay to the newsgroup. The essay described a conspiracy theory:

The original anti-spammer was in truth a major spammer just one day before two major lumber companies deposited a total of $275,000 into his account. He instantly stopped spamming and began what is now the biggest anti-spam ring on the Internet.

The reasoning provided in the essay was that certain companies first destroy forests and make paper out of them, which is in turn used to send bulk mail. Since sending e-mail spam does not use paper at all, the essay argued, the lumber companies would want to stop it before it would surpass paper-based bulk mailing, and consequently only those in the pay of the lumber companies would be anti-spam.

The rationale was based in disclaimers in certain spam messages that they were using electronic means in order to save paper. The joke eventually led to a club and numerous parody websites, most of which have long since disappeared.

Gatherings of anti-spammers on Usenet began to ridicule proponents of this theory, and many participants in news.admin.net-abuse.email chose to dub themselves as members of "the Lumber Cartel" in their signatures, followed immediately by the acronymic disclaimer "TinLC" (There is no Lumber Cartel), reminiscent of the There Is No Cabal catchphrase. People were able to register with a website about the Lumber Cartel and were given a sequential membership number. That was added to email sig files in news.admin.net-abuse.email and used on personal websites. There was no verification or requirement to receive the membership number.

== See also ==
- Culture jamming
