= Telephone service =

Telephone service may refer to:

- Improved Mobile Telephone Service (IMTS)
- Local telephone service
- Mobile Telephone Service (MTS)
- Plain old telephone service (POTS)
- Helpline
- Telephone line
- a customer service callcenter or "telephone answering service"
- a telecommunication provider
- Telephone switchboard
  - Switchboard operators

== See also ==
- Telephone network
- Telecommunications network
- Telephone Doctor
