= Make Money Fast =

Electronic chain letter

Make Money Fast (stylised as MAKE.MONEY.FAST) is a title of an electronically forwarded chain letter which first appeared on the Internet in 1989. It was widely distributed throughout dial-up BBSes, Usenet newsgroups, and email. In anti-spammer slang, the name is often abbreviated "MMF".

The emails were a form of pyramid scheme that involved sending small amounts of money to the postal addresses listed in the received email, then adding one's own name and address to the list before sending the email on to others.

== Excerpt ==
Dear Friend,

My name is Dave Rhodes. In September 1988 my car was reposessed [sic] and the bill collectors were hounding me like you wouldn't believe. I was laid off and my unemployment checks had run out. The only escape I had from the pressure of failure was my Apple computer and my modem. I longed to turn my advocation into my vocation.

This January 1989 my family and I went on a ten day cruise to the tropics. I bought a Lincoln Town Car for CASH in Feburary [sic] 1989. I am currently building a home on the West Coast of Florida, with a private pool, boat slip, and a beautiful view of the bay from my breakfast room table and patio. I will never have to work again. Today I am rich! I have earned over $400,000.00 (Four Hundred Thousand Dollars) to date and will become a millionaire within 4 or 5 months. Anyone can do the same. This money making program works perfectly every time, 100% of the time. I have NEVER failed to earn $50,000.00 or more whenever I wanted. Best of all you never have to leave home except to go to your mailbox or post office.

[...]

1) Immediately mail $1.00 to the first 5 names listed below starting at number 1 through number 5. Send cash only please (total investment $5.00). ENCLOSE A NOTE WITH EACH LETTER STATING: "Please add my name to your mailing list."

== History ==
=== Background ===
This form of chain letter can trace its roots to the "Prosperity Club" postal chain letter, which began in Denver, Colorado in 1935. This letter advised participants to add their name and address to the bottom of a list of six people, removing the name at the top and sending that individual ten cents by mail, and sending a copy of the letter to five friends. The letter promised that, assuming all recipients participated as instructed, the participant would eventually receive 6^{5} dimes, or $1,562.50 (equivalent to $36,680 in 2025).

The postal service was soon overwhelmed with chain letters. By April 27, more than a week after the fad began, the Post Office published a ruling that the scheme was illegal under lottery and fraud statutes. Despite this, copycat schemes spread across the United States, with copyists and printing shops in Springfield, Missouri making thousands of duplicates of chain letters for customers.

Chain letters of this style would continue to circulate throughout the 1980s. Common features included claims of the author's financial success thanks to their chain letter, assurances that the chain letter is entirely legal, and testimonials supposedly written by successful participants. To avoid claims of being a pyramid scheme, letters would add some legitimate-seeming activity such as building a mailing list or selling business advice. At least one such letter circulated digitally through dial-up bulletin board systems as far back as November 4, 1987, under such filenames as "CASHFLOW.TXT" and "EARN$.DOC".

=== Dave Rhodes chain letter ===
The now-infamous Dave Rhodes "MAKE.MONEY.FAST" online chain message originated as a postal chain letter. Anecdotal evidence suggests that chain letters bearing Rhodes' name were widely circulated as far back as the late 1970s, with well-documented appearances as early as April 16, 1986. The letter gives Rhodes' home town as Norfolk, Virginia.

A 1986 version of the letter begins with a claim that the author's car was repossessed in September 1983, but that by participating in a chain letter in October 1983, he earned over $200,000 (equivalent to $646,509 in 2025), spending money on a 10 day cruise, buying a 1984 Cadillac in cash, and building a home in Virginia. A nearly identical chain letter, received in April 1989, changes the author's name to Joe Strelecki and updates the story's beginning to September 1985. In both cases, the participant is advised to mail one dollar to each of five listed participants before adding their name to the list, then send copies of the letter to a mailing list of 100 addresses available at a cost of $13 from a PO Box in Fort Lauderdale, Florida. Variations on the message change the author's name, the years in question, the year model of Cadillac or model of car supposedly purchased, the address from which one is advised to order the mailing list, or the addition of endorsements supposedly written by a lawyer or prior participant.

=== Digital appearances ===
In 1989, a version of the Dave Rhodes letter was distributed on dial-up bulletin board systems in the United States.

This version updates the story to begin in September 1988, with the addition of an Apple computer and modem to the narrative. The car is updated to a Lincoln Town Car supposedly purchased in "Feburary" [sic] 1989, the new home is now built the West Coast of Florida, and the amount earned is increased to $400,000. It also features endorsements by three supposed prior participants, which are written with the same text spacing and line length as the main letter and also mention Apple computers.

It now features a list of ten names and addresses, with instructions to mail one dollar to the top five entries only. The participant is then advised to add their name and address to the bottom, delete the top entry, and upload the file to ten dial-up bulletin board systems using the filename "MAKE.MONEY.FAST". However, due to the 8.3 filename limitation imposed by many BBSes, it was in practice distributed under other filenames. One upload dated December 11, 1989, was uploaded with the filename MAKECASH.DOC inside an archive named QUIKCASH.ZIP; surviving BBS file listings suggest this appeared at least as early as September 28, 1989, with at least one earlier chain letter using the title QCASH.ZIP uploaded to The Modem Zone BBS, dated April 21, 1989.

Although the letter specifically advised the use of modem BBS systems, it was also widely forwarded over email and Usenet, which would become more popular throughout the 1990s. The earliest known Internet distribution of the Dave Rhodes chain letter was a post to Usenet on November 13, 1989, by one David Walton of Takoma Park, MD, then a student at Columbia Union College. This version of the post suggested the alternative filename FASTCASH, omitted all but one of the endorsement letters, and, among other edits, added an advertisement for a dial-up BBS named "DC Follies". It was crossposted to the discussion groups misc.forsale, dc.general, misc.invest, misc.jobs.misc, misc.misc, and ga.forsale, where it was poorly received. A few days later, Walton's Usenet access was terminated by university staff, and a cancel message was issued.

Nevertheless, copies of the chain letter continued to circulate, either via Walton's post or other branches from BBSes. By 1994, "Make Money Fast" became one of the most persistent spam messages on BBSes and Usenet, with multiple variations. Several Usenet group FAQs specifically forbade "MAKE.MONEY.FAST" or the "Dave Rhodes" chain letter by name.

Its infamy led to various parodies. One widespread parody begins with the subject of, "GET.ARRESTED.FAST" and the line, "Hi, I'm Dave Rhodes, and I'm in jail". Another parody sent around in academic circles is, "Make Tenure Fast", substituting the sending of money to individuals on a list with listing journal citations. Another popular parody depicts the cast of movie commentary show Mystery Science Theater 3000 reacting to the chain letter. A Usenet group was established in February 1994 to parody the chain letter, named "alt.make.money.fast".

=== Variation ===
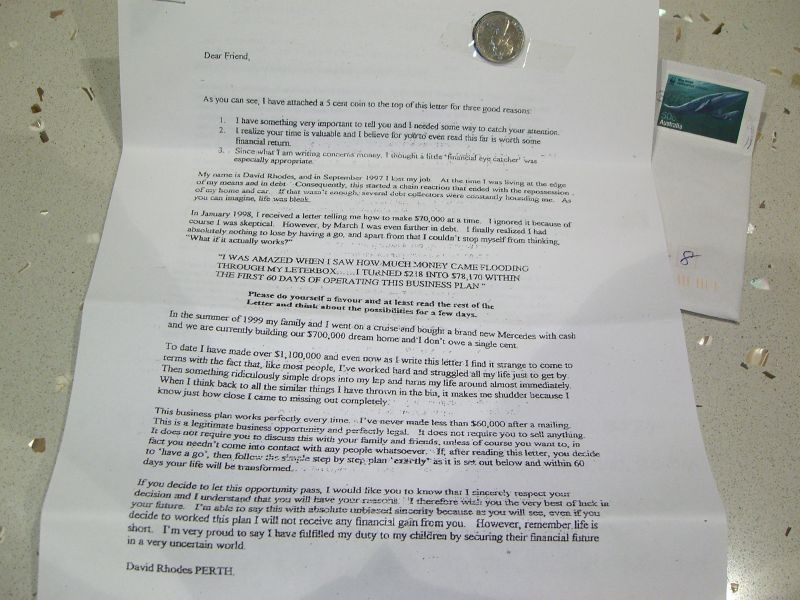
A printed, Australian version of the chain letter (using the name "David Rhodes") from 2006, with a five-cent coin taped to it as what it calls a "financial eye-catcher"

As new users joined the Internet in the late 1990s and early 2000s, MAKE.MONEY.FAST continued to appear on Usenet, acquiring various mutations over time. Common amendments included exhortations for users to participate honestly and actually send the money, promises that the system really worked, claims to have contacted previous participants who reported great success, surveys to support the letter's legitimacy as a marketing tool rather than a pyramid scheme, friendly messages for other participants, formatting changes, and additional instructions to transmit the message by email, Usenet, or postal mail.

One variant of the chain letter, appearing as early as December 12, 1993, omits the Dave Rhodes name and story, but shows direct inspiration from the Rhodes letter, including the instruction to send money to only five of a list of ten people, instructions to post to BBSes, and the recommendation letters by Charles Kust et al. The name Dave Rhodes was so widely known on Usenet at this point that its omission here was noted. By 7 November, 1995, a version arises with only five names. A further evolution appearing in a post of August 11, 1996, now instructs users to post the message to at least 200 newsgroups instead. By October 9, 1996, it would be introduced with the words "A little while back, I was browsing through these newsgroups, just like you are now[...]". Versions of this would continue to circulate as recently as 2019. In one late variant, users were advised to use the payment service PayPal to send the money instead of mail.

At least one version of the Dave Rhodes letter posted to Usenet in 1997 appears to have derived completely independently from a 1992 version of the original postal chain letter, referring to the car purchased as a Cadillac as in the original. Another postal variant circulating in the UK around 2002-2003 begins its story dated September 1997, and advised participants to send £10 to the user at the top of the list of ten before sending out 200 letters; in this version, the car Rhodes supposedly buys is a Mercedes-Benz, a luxury brand better known in the UK.

Various posts claimed to have discovered the identity of Dave Rhodes, but all were either hoaxes or mistaken. A supposed self-published web site by Dave Rhodes was determined to be fake. In 1994, the FAQ of the net.legends Usenet news group asserted that David Rhodes was a student at Columbia Union College; however, this appears to be a conflation with David Walton, the first known person to post it to Usenet, and the FAQ later conceded that the original chain letter was older than this. Another Usenet post reproduced an email supposedly written by FBI agent Melvin Purvis, alleging that Rhodes had been apprehended and sentenced to seven years in prison for mail fraud; this too was found to be a hoax.

== Efficacy ==
Despite lurid success stories distributed with the chain letter, there is a lack of independently verified examples of success.

In "Truth About Chain Letters" (1986), Dan Squier describes forwarding a similar postal chain letter to 500 people, receiving zero responses and a warning letter from the Postal Inspector. One story accompanying a Dave Rhodes letter on Usenet alleges that a participant received only $92, far less than the promised $50,000. Contemporary observers also noted the implausibility of maintaining a pattern of exponential growth long enough to reach the promised amount, and the likelihood of BBS operators to ban the chain letter from their systems. Law enforcement in the US has advised that "the chances of you receiving anything in return are slim. Most people will receive nothing".

There were numerous documented instances of a participant entering their name higher up the list, presumably with the aim of receiving money sooner. Some inserted themselves at #5, the earliest level to receive money; others replaced existing entries with their own name. Various amendments to the letter reflected a general concern of dishonesty among participants, and instances of people forwarding the letter without mailing the cash would be difficult for later participants to detect. The use of P.O. boxes led to speculation that some participants were using pseudonyms to make multiple entries, although this was not conclusively proven.

== Legality ==
The text of the letter originally claimed this practice is "perfectly legal", citing Title 18, Sections 1302 & 1341 of the postal lottery laws. On the contrary, the U.S. Postal Inspection Service cites Title 18, United States Code, Section 1302 when it asserts the illegality of chain letters, including the "Make Money Fast" scheme:

There's at least one problem with chain letters. They're illegal if they request money or other items of value and promise a substantial return to the participants. Chain letters are a form of gambling, and sending them through the mail (or delivering them in person or by computer, but mailing money to participate) violates Title 18, United States Code, Section 1302, the Postal Lottery Statute (Chain letters that ask for items of minor value, like picture postcards or recipes, may be mailed, since such items are not things of value within the meaning of the law).

It also asserts that, "Regardless of what technology is used to advance the scheme, if the mail is used at any step along the way, it is still illegal." The U.S. Postal Inspection Service warns of the mathematical impossibility that all participants will be winners, as well as the likelihood that participants may fail to send money to the first person listed, and the perpetrator may have been listed multiple times under different addresses and names, thus ensuring that all the money goes to the same person.

In later years, one avenue that spammers have used to circumvent the postal laws, is to conduct business by non-postal routes, such as sending an email message and instructing recipients to send money via electronic services such as PayPal. While the specific laws mentioned above will only be violated if regular postal mail is used at some point during the process of communication, the sending of chain letters is often prohibited by the terms of service and/or user agreements of many email providers, and can result in an account being suspended or revoked. In 2022, the Federal Trade Commission announced a complaint into participants in a similar Bitcoin-based chain referral scheme.

== See also ==
- List of internet phenomena
- List of spammers
- Pyramid scheme
- Spam (electronic)
- No such thing as a free lunch
