= Etiquette in technology =

Code of behavior for use of the Internet

Etiquette in technology, colloquially referred to as netiquette, is a term used to refer to the unofficial code of policies that encourage good behavior on the Internet which is used to regulate respect and polite behavior on social media platforms, online chatting sites, web forums, and other online engagement websites. The rules of etiquette that apply when communicating over the Internet are different from these applied when communicating in person or by audio (such as telephone) or video call. It is a social code that is used in all places where one can interact with other human beings via the Internet, including text messaging, email, online games, Internet forums, chat rooms, and many more. Although social etiquette in real life is ingrained into our social life, netiquette is a fairly recent concept.

It can be a challenge to communicate on the Internet without misunderstandings mainly because input from facial expressions and body language is absent in cyberspace. Therefore, several rules, in an attempt to safeguard against these misunderstandings and to discourage unfriendly behavior, are regularly put in place at many websites, and often enforced by moderation by the website's users or administrators.

== Netiquette ==
Netiquette, a colloquial portmanteau of network and etiquette or Internet and etiquette, is a set of social conventions that facilitate interaction over networks, ranging from Usenet and mailing lists to blogs and forums.

Like the network itself, these developing norms remain in a state of flux and vary from community to community. The points most strongly emphasized about Usenet netiquette often include using simple electronic signatures, and avoiding multiposting, cross-posting, off-topic posting, hijacking a discussion thread, and other techniques used to minimize the effort required to read a post or a thread. Similarly, some Usenet guidelines call for use of unabbreviated English while users of instant messaging protocols like SMS occasionally encourage just the opposite, bolstering use of SMS language.

Common rules for e-mail and Usenet such as avoiding flamewars and spam are constant across most mediums and communities. Another rule is to avoid typing in all caps or excessively enlarging script for emphasis, which is considered to be the equivalent of shouting or yelling. Other commonly shared points, such as remembering that one's posts are (or can easily be made) public, are generally intuitively understood by publishers of Web pages and posters to Usenet, although this rule is somewhat flexible depending on the environment. On more private protocols, however, such as e-mail and SMS, some users take the privacy of their posts for granted. One-on-one communications, such as private messages on chat forums and direct SMS, may be considered more private than other such protocols.

Beyond matters of basic courtesy and privacy, e-mail syntax (defined by RFC 2822) allows for different types of recipients. The primary recipient, defined by the To: line, can reasonably be expected to respond, but recipients of carbon copies cannot be, although they still might. Likewise, misuse of the CC: functions in lieu of traditional mailing lists can result in serious technical issues. In late 2007, employees of the United States Department of Homeland Security used large CC: lists in place of a mailing list to broadcast messages to several hundred users. Misuse of the "reply to all" caused the number of responses to that message to quickly expand to some two million messages, bringing down their mail server. In cases like this, rules of netiquette have more to do with efficient sharing of resources—ensuring that the associated technology continues to function—rather than more basic etiquette. On Usenet, cross-posting, in which a single copy of a message is posted to multiple groups is intended to prevent this from happening, but many newsgroups frown on the practice, as it means users must sometimes read many copies of a message in multiple groups.

When someone makes a mistake—whether it's a spelling error or a spelling flame, a stupid question or an unnecessarily long answer—be kind about it. If it's a minor error, you may not need to say anything. Even if you feel strongly about it, think twice before reacting. Having good manners yourself doesn't give you the license to correct everyone else. If you do decide to inform someone of a mistake, point it out politely, and preferably by private email rather than in public. Give people the benefit of the doubt; assume they just don't know any better. And never be arrogant or self-righteous about it. Just as it's a law of nature that spelling flames always contain spelling errors, notes pointing out Netiquette violations are often examples of poor Netiquette.

Due to the large variation between what is considered acceptable behavior in various professional environments and between professional and social networks, codified internal manuals of style can help clarify acceptable limits and boundaries for user behavior. For instance, failure to publish such a guide for e-mail style was cited among the reasons for an NZ$17,000 wrongful dismissal finding against a firm that fired a woman for misuse of boldface colorful all caps text in company-wide e-mail traffic.

Netiquette continues to evolve with the rise of social media, online forums, and digital communication platforms, providing guidance on respectful and effective interactions in modern online communities.

=== Netiquette in South Korea ===
In South Korea, the Korea Internet Safety Commission declared the 'Netizen Ethics Code' on June 15, 2000, and the Ministry of Education prepared the 'Information Communication Ethics Education Guidelines' in early 2001. Therefore, some middle and high schools started to provide education on netiquette. The basic netiquette education contents of South Korea are as follows. Postings to a noticeboard should be written clearly and concisely, use proper grammar and Korean spelling, and avoid excessive refutation of other people's writings. In e-mails, identify yourself and send a letter. When chatting, you should introduce yourself first, engage in conversation, use the title "Nim," and do not slander, abuse, or make sarcastic remarks. Furthermore, it is against etiquette to repeat the same thing over and over again, and you must offer parting salutations when you come out of a chat. Furthermore, do not engage in sexual harassment, stalking, or the use of expletives.

== Digital citizenship ==
Digital citizenship is how a person should act while using digital technology online and has also been defined as "the ability to participate in society online". The term is often mentioned in relation to Internet safety and netiquette.

The term has been used as early as 1998 and has gone through several changes in description as newer technological advances have changed the method and frequency of how people interact with one another online. Classes on digital citizenship have been taught in some public education systems and some argue that the term can be "measured in terms of economic and political activities online".

== Cell phone etiquette ==
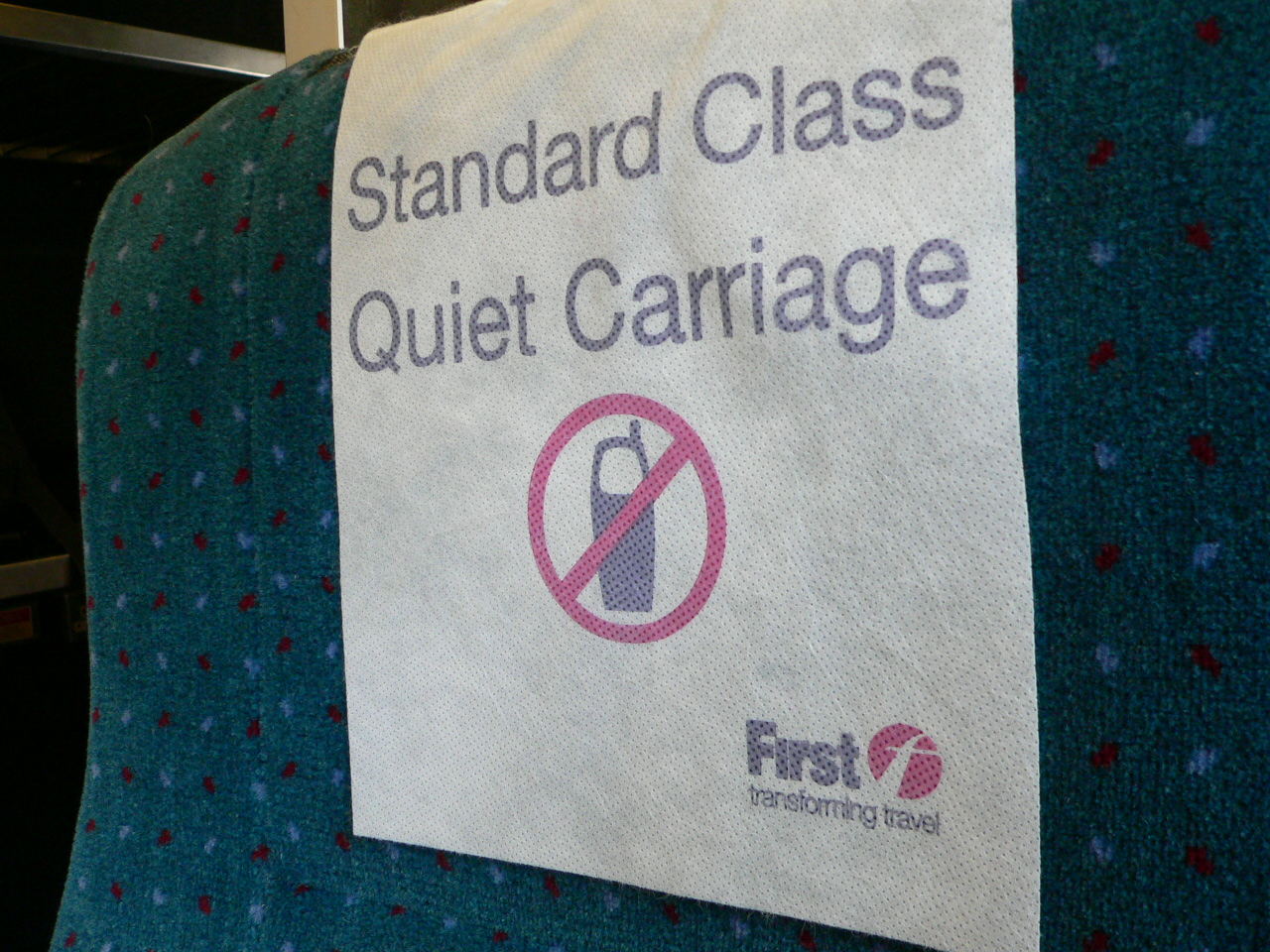
A headrest cover in the "quiet carriage" of a British intercity train, reminding passengers that mobile phones must not be used in this carriage

The issue of mobile communication and etiquette has also become an issue of academic interest. The rapid adoption of the device has resulted in the intrusion of telephony into situations where it was previously not used. This has exposed the implicit rules of courtesy and opened them to re-evaluation.

=== In the education system ===
Most schools in the United States, Europe and Canada have prohibited mobile phones in the classroom, citing class disruptions and the potential for cheating via text messaging. In the UK, possession of a mobile phone in an examination can result in immediate disqualification from that subject or from all that student's subjects. This still applies even if the mobile phone was not turned on at the time. In New York City, students were banned from taking cell phones to school until 2015. This has been a debate for several years, but finally passed legislature in 2008.

"Most schools allow students to have cell phones for safety purposes"—a reaction to the Columbine High School massacre (Lipscomb 2007: 50). Apart from emergency situations, most schools don't officially allow students to use cell phones during class time.

=== In the public sphere ===
Talking or texting on a cell phone in public may seem a distraction for many individuals. When in public there are two times when one uses a phone. The first is when the user is alone; the other is when the user is in a group. The main issue for most people is when they are in a group, and the cell phone becomes a distraction or a barrier for successful socialization among family and friends. In the past few years, society has become less tolerant of cell phone use in public areas; for example, public transportation, restaurants and much more. This is exemplified by the widespread recognition of campaigns such as Stop Phubbing, which prompted discussion as to how mobile phones should be used in the presence of others. "Some have suggested that mobile phones 'affect every aspect of our personal and professional lives either directly or indirectly'" (Humphrey). Every culture's tolerance of cell phone usage varies; for instance in Western society cell phones are permissible during free time at schools, whereas in the Eastern countries, cell phones are strictly prohibited on school property.

Mobile phone use can be an important matter of social discourtesy, such as phones ringing during funerals or weddings, in toilets, cinemas and theatres. Some book shops, libraries, bathrooms, cinemas, doctors' offices and places of worship prohibit their use, so that other patrons will not be disturbed by conversations. Some facilities install signal-jamming equipment to prevent their use. Some new auditoriums have installed wire mesh in the walls to make a Faraday cage, which prevents signal penetration without violating signal jamming laws.

A working group made up of Finnish telephone companies, public transport operators and communications authorities has launched a campaign to remind mobile phone users of courtesy, especially when using mass transit—what to talk about on the phone, and how to. In particular, the campaign wants to impact loud mobile phone usage as well as calls regarding sensitive matters.

Trains, particularly those involving long-distance services, often offer a "quiet carriage" where phone use is prohibited, much like the designated non-smoking carriage of the past. In the UK however many users tend to ignore this as it is rarely enforced, especially if the other carriages are crowded and they have no choice but to go in the "quiet carriage". In Japan, it is generally considered impolite to talk using a phone on any train; e-mailing is generally the mode of mobile communication. Mobile phone usage on local public transport is also increasingly seen as a nuisance; the Austrian city of Graz, for instance, has mandated a total ban of mobile phones on its tram and bus network in 2008 (though texting and emailing is still allowed).

Nancy J. Friedman has spoken widely about landline and cell phone etiquette.

=== Within social relationships ===
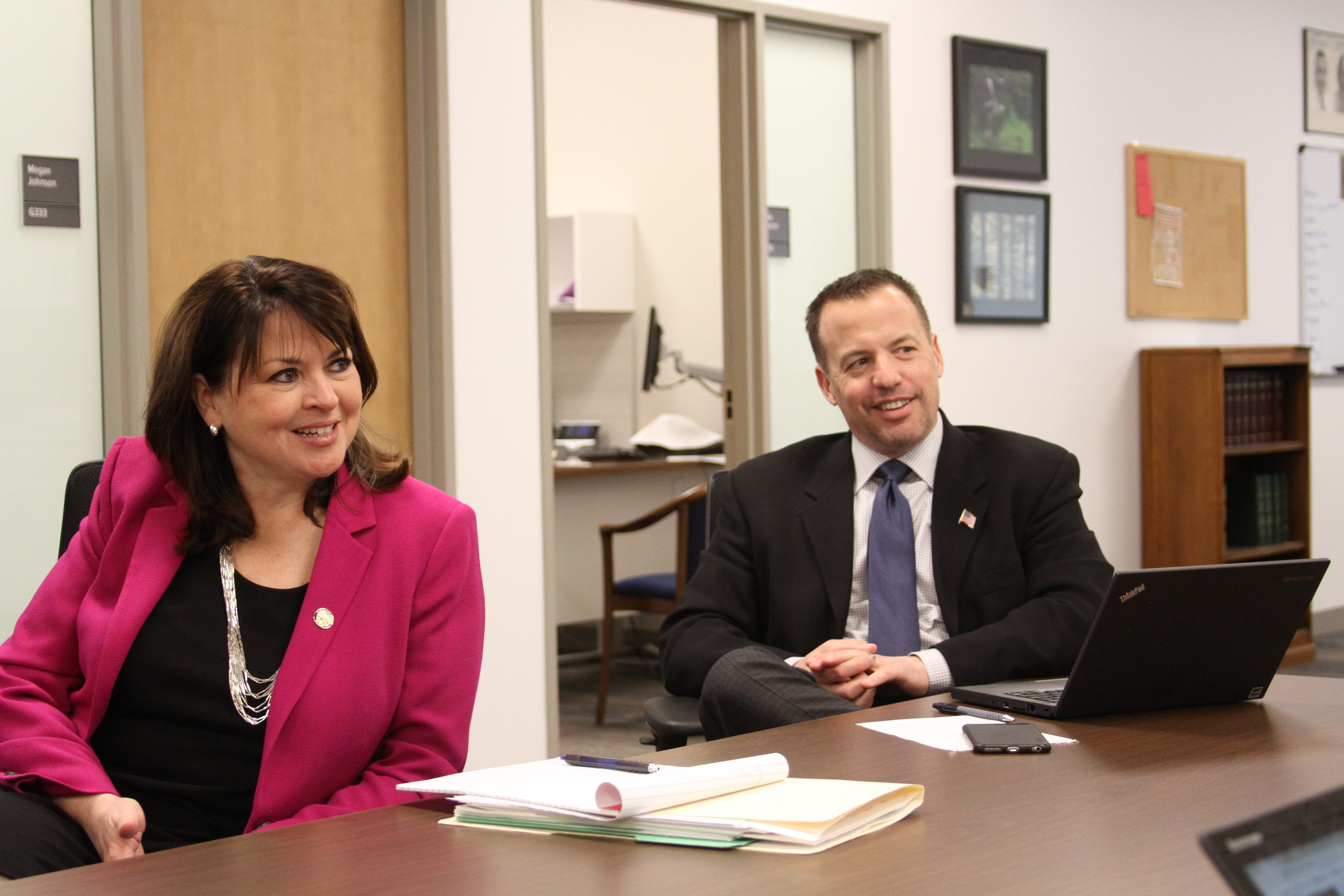
Senator Matt Klein with cellphone turned face down (2017)

When critically assessing the family structure, it is important to examine the parent/child negotiations which occur in the household, in relation to the increased use of cell phones. Teenagers use their cell phones as a way to negotiate spatial boundaries with their parents (Williams 2005:316). This includes extending curfews in the public space and allowing more freedom for the teenagers when they are outside of the home (Williams 2005:318). More importantly, cell phone etiquette relates to kinship groups and the family as an institution. This is because cell phones act as a threat due to the rapid disconnect within families. Children are often so closely affiliated with their technological gadgets, and they tend to interact with their friends constantly and this has a negative impact on their relationship with their parents (Williams 2005:326). Teenagers see themselves as gaining a sense of empowerment from the mobile phone. Cell phone etiquette in the household from an anthropological perspective has shown an evolution in the institution of family. The mobile phone has now been integrated into family practices and perpetuated a wider concern which is the fracture between parent and child relationships. We are able to see the traditional values disappearing; however, reflexive monitoring is occurring (Williams 2005:320). Through this, parents are becoming friendlier with their children and critics emphasize that this change is problematic because children should be subjected to social control. One way of social control is limiting the time spent interacting with friends, which is difficult to do in today's society because of the rapid use of cell phones.

== Netiquette vs. cell phone etiquette ==
Cell phone etiquette is largely dependent on the cultural context and what is deemed to be socially acceptable. For instance, in certain cultures using your handheld devices while interacting in a group environment is considered bad manners, whereas, in other cultures around the world it may be viewed differently. In addition, cell phone etiquette also encompasses the various types of activities which are occurring and the nature of the messages which are being sent. More importantly, messages of an inappropriate nature can be sent to an individual and this could potentially orchestrate problems such as verbal/cyber abuse.

=== New technology and behavior ===
One of the biggest obstacles to communication in online settings is the lack of emotional cues. Facial cues dictate the mood and corresponding diction of people in conversations. During phone conversations, tone of voice communicates the emotions of the speakers removed on opposite sides of phone lines. Conversely, in chat rooms, instant messaging apps, texting, and other text-based communication, signals that would indicate a person's emotional state are absent. Because of this, accommodations have been developed, notably the use of emoticons and abbreviations. Emoticons use punctuation marks and symbols to graphically represent facial expressions. For example, a colon and parenthesis can be used to represent a smiling face, indicating happiness or satisfaction. To symbolize laughter, the abbreviation "LOL" (standing for "laughing out loud") developed. Other commonly used abbreviations are "BRB" ("be right back") and "TTYL" ("talk to you later").

=== Post-irony and tone ===
Due to difficulty in conveying tone, emotion, or facial expression through text, Post-irony through both comedy (notably surreal, satire, cringe, or anti-humor) and internet etiquette has occurred in more online-only focused communities, commonly blurring lines and creating issues where unfamiliar or new users may be oblivious to how an under-case "lol" may be perceived as a disingenuous expression of laughing compared to the grammatically analogous "lmao". Quick adoption of connotation, combined with the Internet's global presence, has resulted in large portions of modern slang, either being created by, or popularized through the use of internet social media.

==== Tone indicators ====
Certain frameworks of tone indication have arisen from the difficulty of constant re-appropriation of internet slang or abbreviations. Most notably, slashes (/) may be used at the end of a message that the sender finds hard to perceive tone. An example being "I was really happy to hang out with you today, I'm glad to have you as a friend. /gen", (genuine). Since the same statement without tone indication may be perceived as satire or ironic in experienced internet spaces, it is often necessary to either re-word or apply a direct indication of tone.

=== Snapchat and commercial recognition ===
Now, as newer modes of communication become increasingly common, apps such as Snapchat are growing to develop platform-specific rules and etiquette. Snapchat lets a user send pictures or videos that disappear after several seconds. Although it is entirely possible to make use of Snapchat for the purpose of sexting, namely sending nude and erotic photos, originally compared to Instagram by way of the app's ability to broadcast pictures to many people, it has now become standard to communicate through Snapchat by sending pictures back and forth and using the caption bar for messages. The reply option on Snapchat specifically promotes this behavior, but Snapchat etiquette is not set in stone. Some people use Snapchat specifically for the purpose of communication, while some use it to simply provide a visual update of their day. The newest update to Snapchat, an instant messaging add-on, seems to be catered to those who use the app to send messages back and forth.

== See also ==
- Digital citizen
- Eternal September
- Restrictions on cell phone use by U.S. drivers
- Shotgun email
