= Chain letter =

Letter written in succession by a group of people

A chain letter is a message that attempts to convince the recipient to make a number of copies and pass them on to a certain number of recipients. The "chain" is an exponentially growing pyramid (a tree graph) that cannot be sustained.

Common methods used in chain letters include emotionally manipulative stories, get-rich-quick pyramid schemes, and the exploitation of superstition to threaten the recipient with misfortune or promise good luck. Originally, chain letters were letters sent by mail; modern chain letters are often sent electronically via email, social network sites, and text messages.

== Types ==
There are two main types of chain letter:

1. Hoaxes: Hoaxes attempt to trick or defraud users. A hoax could be malicious, instructing users to delete a file necessary to the operating system by claiming it is a virus. It could also be a scam that convinces users to spread the letter to other people for a specific reason, or send money or personal information. Phishing attacks could fall into this category. Get-rich-quick pyramid schemes promising a substantial return for sending money to people on a list are a common form of hoax chain letter.
2. Luck- or superstition-based letters: These letters ostensibly promise good luck for forwarding the message or threaten bad luck (or even death) if the chain is broken or the letter is not forwarded. These often prey on superstition. This category includes urban legends designed to be redistributed, usually warning users of a threat or claiming to be notifying them of important or urgent information. It is often assumed that the language and attempt to convince the reader to continue the chain are sincere but is also sometimes interpreted ironically as mocking a person who actually takes the statement literally. Another common form are emails that ostensibly promise users monetary rewards for forwarding the message or suggest that they are signing something that will be submitted to a particular group. These usually have no negative effect aside from wasted time and potential anxiety for the recipient.

In the United States, chain letters that request money or other items of value and promise a substantial return to the participants (such as the infamous Make Money Fast scheme) are illegal. Some colleges and military bases have passed regulations stating that in the private mail of college students and military personnel, respectively, chain letters are not authorized and will be thrown out. However, it is often difficult to distinguish chain letters from genuine correspondence.

== Channels ==
=== Print ===
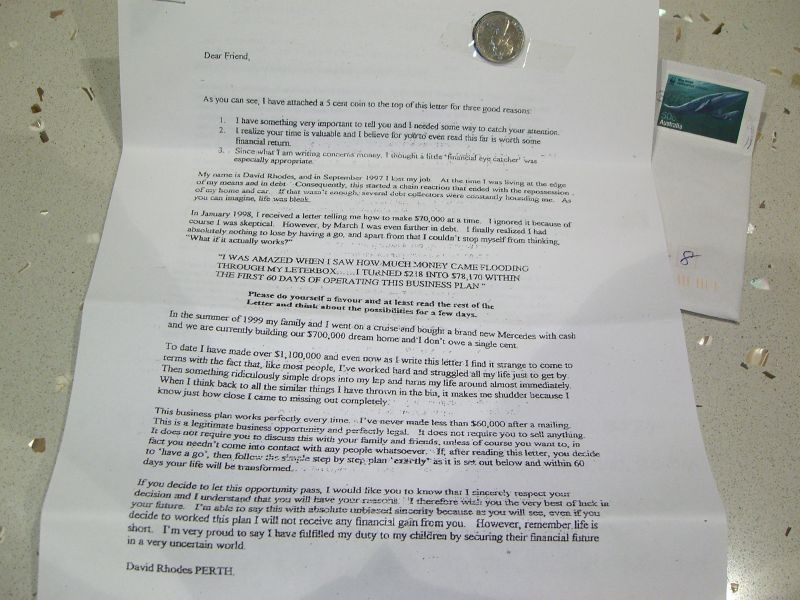
Printed Australian chain letter from 2006, with a five-cent coin taped to it as what it calls a "financial eye-catcher". The mention of "David Rhodes" makes it a variant of the notorious Make Money Fast chain letter.

The oldest known channel for chain letters is written, or printed, on letters on paper. These might be exchanged hand-to-hand or distributed through the mail.

==== Early examples and precursors ====
In Europe, letters known as "Himmelsbrief" (English: Heaven Letters; German: Himmelsbrief) existed, with examples dating back as early as the 6th century. Purported to have fallen from heaven, delivered by God or an agent thereof, they often urged adherence to Christian teachings and promised protection from misfortune to those who possessed the letter. By the 20th century, these evolved to include instructions: copying the letter and sending it to a set number of people would bring good fortune, while failing to do so would bring misfortune. Eventually, the religious elements faded, leaving simple instructions to circulate the letter for good luck or face bad luck. Already in the nineteenth century, similar chain letters were known to have circulated among Muslim pilgrims going on the hajj to Mecca. Those chain letters promised blessings or curses and required replication.

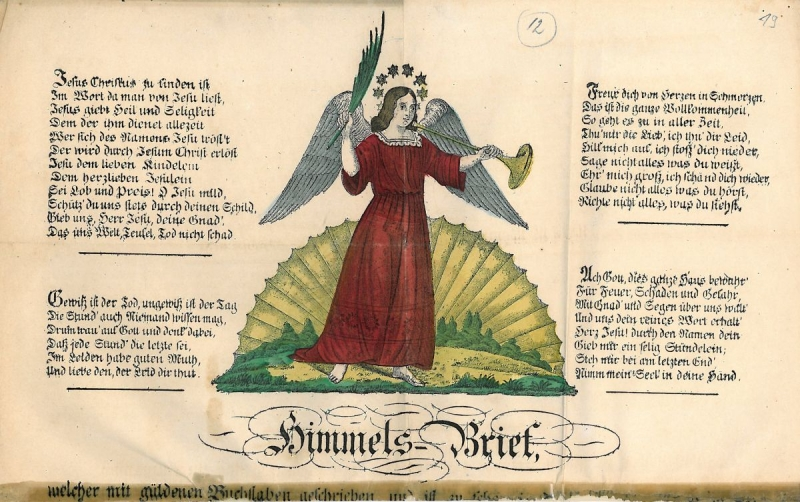
An example of a "Heaven Letter" (Himmelsbrief) from around 1800

One notorious early example of a money-based chain letter was the "Prosperity Club" or "Send-a-Dime" letter. This letter started in Denver, Colorado in 1935, based on an earlier luck letter. It instructed recipients to send a dime to the person at the top of a list of names, remove that name, add their own to the bottom, and mail the letter to five others, warning of misfortune for breaking the chain. It soon swamped the Denver post office with up to 100,000 letters per day before spilling into St. Louis and other cities. Some consider this a precursor to the Japanese "Fukou no Tegami" (Unlucky Letter).

In 1964, the head of the United States Postal Inspection Service ordered a nationwide crackdown on violators of postal fraud and lottery laws due to an increase of chain letters reported around college towns in the United States. The typical letters included a list of names and instructed the recipient to send money to the name at the top of the list, remove that name, add their own name to the bottom of the list, and forward the letters to two more people.

==== Chain letters in Japan ====
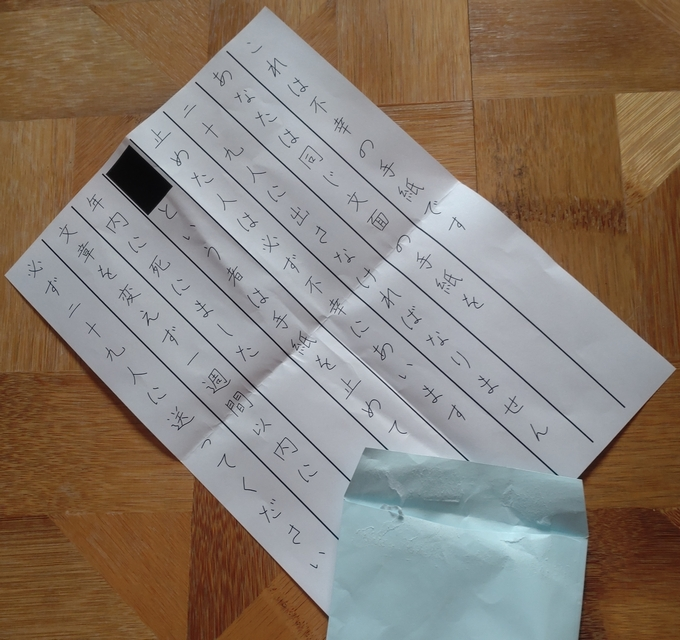
A modern example of a handwritten "Fukou no Tegami" (Unlucky Letter)

Japan has a long history of practices resembling chain letters, often tied to warding off misfortune or attracting good luck through specific, shared actions. During the Edo period (Bunsei era, 1818–1830), sending printed images of Daikokuten with instructions to distribute them to 100 homes for good luck became popular, eventually banned by the shogunate but resurfacing in the early Meiji period. Other historical examples include rumors in 1813 that seeing a specific star meant death unless one ate botamochi, and rumors during World War II involving the mythical creature Kudan predicting protection from air raids if one ate azuki rice or ohagi, or Takami Jun's diary entry about eating only rakkyō for breakfast to avoid bombings, provided the information was shared. This cultural background of sharing methods to attract luck or avoid disaster is seen as a foundation for the later popularity of chain letters in Japan.

===== Kōun no Tegami (幸運の手紙 - Lucky Letter) =====
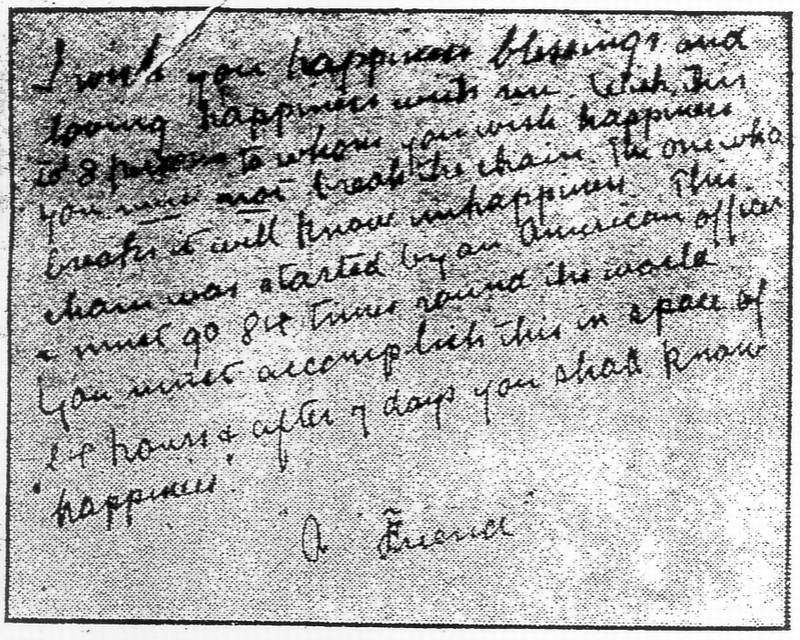
An English-language "Lucky Letter" reported in the Tokyo Asahi Shimbun, 20 November 1922

Beginning around 1922 in Tokyo, "Kōun no Tegami" (幸運の手紙 - Lucky Letter), also called "Kōun no Hagaki" (Lucky Postcard), became popular. Believed to originate from the "Lucky Chain" game popular in Europe during World War I or similar chain letters in the US, these letters were translated into Japanese. A 30 January 1922, Tokyo Asahi Shimbun article mentions a postcard mailed from London, suggesting foreign origins.

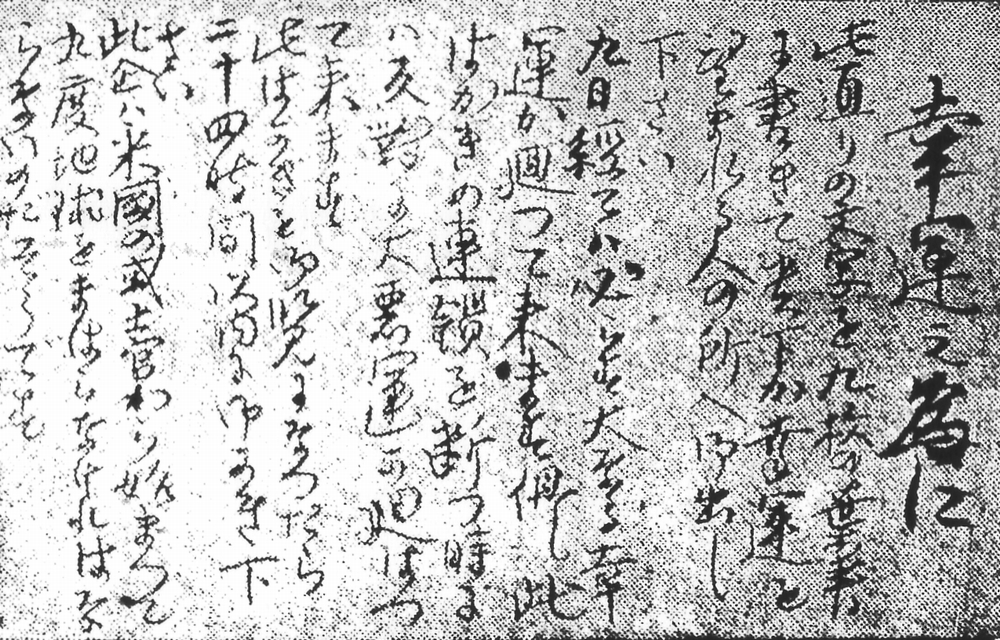
A Japanese "Lucky Letter" titled "For Good Fortune" (幸運之為に), featured in the Tokyo Asahi Shimbun, 27 January 1922

These letters promised great fortune if the recipient copied the text onto a certain number of postcards (e.g., nine) and sent them to others within a time limit (e.g., 24 hours), but threatened "great misfortune" (大悪運, dai-aku'un) if the chain was broken. Some included harsh warnings like "great disaster within 24 hours" for breaking the chain. The letters often mentioned the chain needing to circle the globe a certain number of times (e.g., nine times), reflecting the era of mail transport by ship. An example from the 27 January 1922, Tokyo Asahi Shimbun reads:

For Good Fortune

Please write these exact words on nine postcards and send them to people from whom you wish good fortune.

After nine days, great fortune will surely come your way. However, if you break this postcard chain, great misfortune will come instead.

Please write these within twenty-four hours of seeing this postcard.

This venture was started by an American officer and must circle the globe nine times.

— "Handwritten letter example", 丸山 2022, pp. 18–19 citing Tokyo Asahi Shimbun

The phenomenon became a social issue, frequently reported in newspapers.

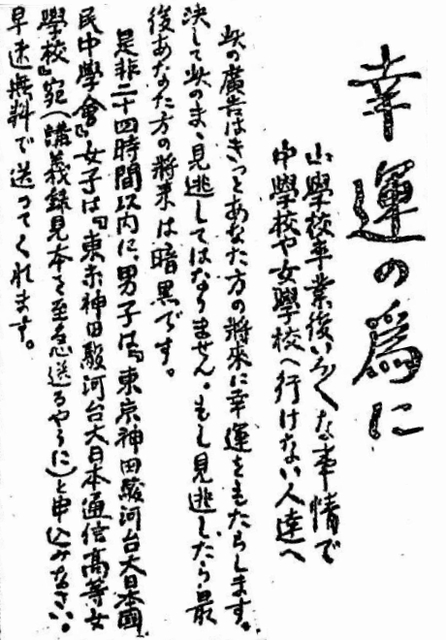
A 1922 advertisement in the Tokyo Asahi Shimbun mimicking the style of a Lucky Letter

Politicians used them for campaigns, and businesses created advertisements mimicking the format, leveraging the free distribution network. Writer and social critic Miyatake Gaikotsu documented the trend in his 1922 book Kitai Ryūkōshi (History of Strange Fads), noting people sent them out of fear of misfortune. (Gaikotsu stated his interest in the Lucky Letter phenomenon inspired him to write the book.) Unlike later "Unlucky Letters," the focus was theoretically on gaining luck, but the fear of incurring bad luck by breaking the chain often dominated. While Western interpretations often focused on monetary gain/loss, Japanese interpretations tended towards physical harm, illness, or death as the consequence of misfortune. Newspaper accounts described people overcome with anxiety, sending the letters despite skepticism. The potential for exponential growth (one person sending nine, repeated ten times, yielding over 3.4 billion letters) was also noted as problematic. The trend spread, appearing in Fengtian (now Shenyang), Manchuria in May 1922, where authorities attempted, unsuccessfully, to ban them. The 1923 Great Kantō earthquake later led some to view the letter craze as an ill omen.

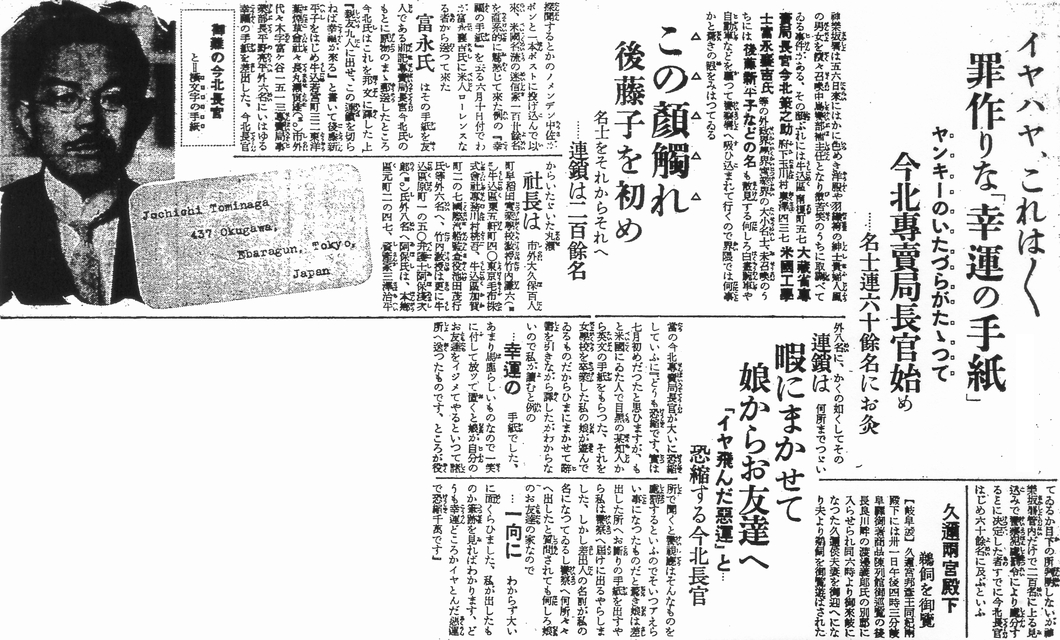
The "Lucky Letter" incident involving prominent figures reported in the Tokyo Nichi Nichi Shimbun, 1 August 1926

In 1926, a Lucky Letter incident involved prominent figures. Imakita Sakunosuke, head of the government's Monopoly Bureau, received an English letter via an American acquaintance and a Japanese scholar. Imakita translated it, added instructions to send to nine friends, and mailed it to influential figures in politics and finance, causing a stir. Police investigated, finding recipients including former Tokyo mayor Gotō Shinpei. The Tokyo Nichi Nichi Shimbun reported the event on 1 August 1926. Imakita claimed his daughter sent them playfully, but some analysts question this, suggesting it might have been a pre-arranged excuse or even an early experiment in information diffusion, given the involvement of military figures and Gotō Shinpei (then president of NHK's predecessor). Political scientist Yoshino Sakuzō also received one in August 1926, dismissing it as foolish but criticizing police intervention as overreach. Despite suppression efforts, senders were sometimes punished.

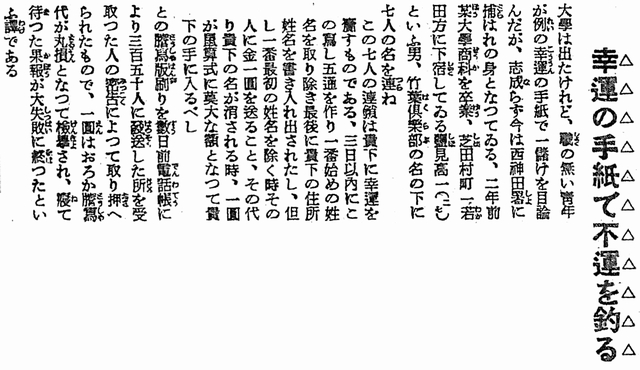
A 1935 Tokyo Asahi Shimbun article reporting an arrest related to a money-based Lucky Letter scheme

Although some sources claim Lucky Letters died out after the Great Kanto Earthquake due to crackdowns, they continued to appear. In 1935, a man was arrested for attempting a money-making scheme similar to the Denver "Send-a-Dime" letter, using the phone book to mail 350 letters asking for small cash contributions.

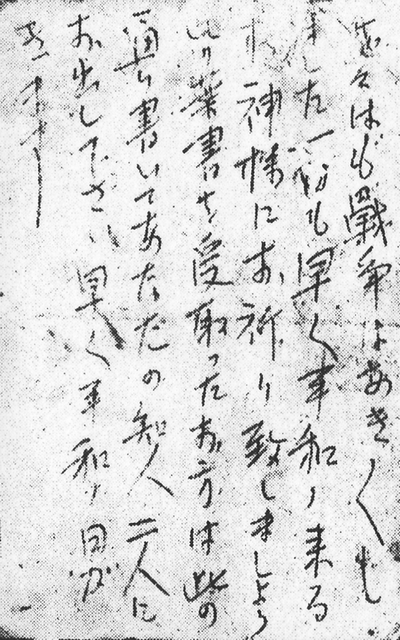
An anti-war chain letter circulated in Japan during World War II (1943)

During World War II (1943), an anti-war chain letter circulated, stating "We are already tired of war. Let us pray to God for peace to come soon," instructing recipients to send copies to two acquaintances (the small number possibly reflecting wartime shortages). Post-war examples include a "Fuku'un no Tegami" (福運の手紙 - Fortune Letter) in 1948–1949, promising large sums of money (e.g., ¥16 million or ¥200,000) if recipients sent a small amount (e.g., ¥2 or ¥20) to the first name on a list, updated the list, and forwarded it to others (e.g., 7 or 15 people).

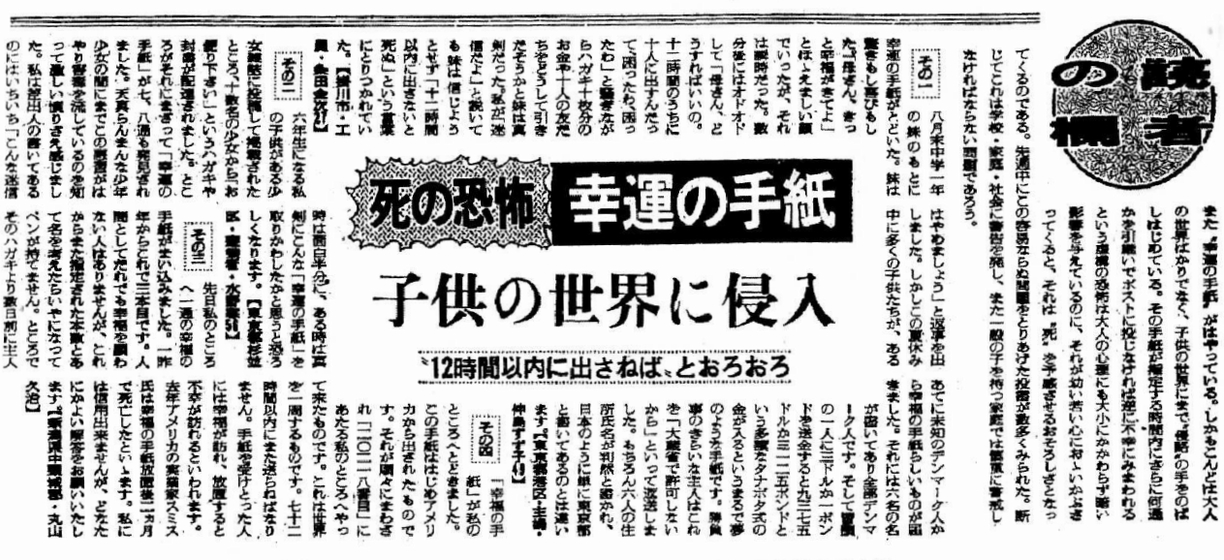
A 1954 Yomiuri Shimbun article discussing the anxiety caused by Lucky Letters

By 1954, newspapers reported on the anxiety these letters caused, with a middle school girl terrified by a threat of death for not forwarding within 12 hours, and a man seeking advice after receiving a letter claiming someone died for ignoring it. Some letters used famous foreign figures, claiming Franklin D. Roosevelt became president by sending one, or Thomas Edison died for not sending one.

===== Fukou no Tegami (不幸の手紙 - Unlucky Letter) =====
The "Fukou no Tegami" (不幸の手紙 - Unlucky Letter) phenomenon is thought to have emerged when the "good luck" aspect of earlier letters disappeared, leaving only the threat of misfortune. Some suggest it began as a simple prank, replacing "good luck" with "bad luck" in existing templates. Research suggests it started trending around 1969 or 1970. Newspaper articles from late 1970 and 1972 trace its spread from Kyushu through Osaka, Nagoya, and Tokyo starting around 1969. Other accounts place the start slightly earlier, around 1965.

By summer 1970, it was prevalent in Tokyo, spreading to the Kinki region (centering on Kyoto) by November 1970, and becoming a nationwide phenomenon that same month. A Yomiuri Shimbun article on 26 November 1970 reported receiving over a hundred complaints since early October. Typical wording included:

This is an Unlucky Letter, a death god that came to me sequentially from Okinawa. A Canadian supposedly thought of it. If you stop it with you, misfortune will certainly visit. A person in Texas stopped it and died five years later. You too, please send this letter to twenty-nine people within thirty hours without changing the text. I am number XXX.

— Quoted in 東 1996, p. 78

This is an Unlucky Letter.
The person who receives it must send the same letter to ten people within one week.
Ms./Mr. ■■ in Class 6-2 at ■■ Elementary School stopped the letter and died in a traffic accident ten days later.
If you ignore this, disaster will surely befall you too.

— Quoted in 初見 2018, redactions in original

External image
- Typical example of a 1970s Fukou no Tegami - Mu PLUS

Variations included different time limits (e.g., 50 hours) and recipient counts (e.g., 29 or 10). The letters often personified themselves ("I am an Unlucky Letter") or invoked a "death god" (死神, shinigami), suggesting the letter itself possessed supernatural power. Many included instructions not to tell anyone about receiving the letter, threatening death if revealed, likely to prevent consultation. They were sent anonymously, sometimes as letters in envelopes, sometimes as postcards. Some 1990s versions replaced "Okinawa" with "Ōita," lacked foreign references, used Japanese names for victims, and ended with "I am also a victim." Like earlier Lucky Letters, some invoked famous foreigners, such as claiming Napoleon Bonaparte died for not sending one.

Recipients were often chosen randomly from phone books or sometimes from alumni or company directories, though senders often expressed reluctance to target people they knew. In the 1970s, before widespread access to photocopiers, recipients had to hand-copy the entire text.

A key difference from earlier Lucky Letters was the anonymity; Lucky Letters often included the sender's name and sometimes a list of previous senders, making the chain's path somewhat traceable. Fukou no Tegami's power was also portrayed as inherent to the letter itself ("this is a death god"), whereas Lucky Letters typically threatened misfortune only as a consequence of *breaking the chain*. Furthermore, while Lucky Letters circulated mainly among adults, Fukou no Tegami spread widely among children (elementary and middle school students) as well, possibly linked to schools becoming hubs for ghost stories during Japan's high-growth period.

After a period of police activity led to a decline in early 1971, the letters resurged in Tokyo by late 1971 and spread nationwide again by May 1972, with letters reported arriving from various regions. The phenomenon persisted into the 1990s, adapting to use photocopiers and fax machines. Minor resurgences occurred from 1990–1992 and again in 1998. In 1993, a Portuguese version circulated within Japan's Brazilian Japanese community, printed via word processor, mixing promises of lottery wins with threats of job loss or spousal death.

===== Social reaction and impact in Japan =====
Fukou no Tegami became a significant social problem, widely covered by media and even becoming a buzzword in 1970. Police stations received numerous inquiries and complaints, with people bringing in letters, demanding action, or expressing fear. A 1970 Sankei Shimbun survey found 75.6% of people knew about the letters, and 20.5% had received one. While nearly half (45.8%) dismissed them as "absurd", significant portions found them "infuriating" (28.9%), "creepy" (12.9%), or "anxiety-inducing" (4.4%). About half (49.3%) discarded them, but 17.4% admitted to forwarding them, particularly women (45% of female office workers surveyed).

Anecdotes highlighted the distress caused: a woman forwarded one despite her husband's objections, leading to marital strife; another developed chronic hives after discarding one and becoming anxious; people angrily confronted police or postal workers. Magazine pen pal sections were inundated, leading some, like the manga magazine Ribon, to shut down columns listing readers' addresses. Occult magazine Mu received so many it started a "Fukou no Tegami Grand Collection" feature. In Saitama Prefecture alone, over 400 cases were reported to police by late 1986, with some individuals reportedly suffering nervous breakdowns.

While many dismissed the letters, others were deeply troubled, caught between the fear of personal misfortune and the guilt of potentially inflicting it on others by forwarding the letter – a dilemma described as highlighting selfishness ("as long as I'm okay") versus conscience. Some admitted forwarding out of a "better safe than sorry" mentality, while others likely sent them maliciously to disliked individuals or simply out of boredom or curiosity about the recipient's reaction.

Prominent figures also received them. Actress Kimiko Ikegami received one in 1975, shortly before her grandfather, Bando Mitsugoro VIII, died unexpectedly, fueling public outrage against the letters. In 1978, Koseki Kinko, wife of composer Yūji Koseki, wrote a widely publicized newspaper column urging people to simply destroy the letters, sharing her own experience of doing so without consequence and encouraging readers to face adversity positively.

===== Expert opinions on the Japanese phenomenon =====
Experts offered various interpretations. Shinto scholar Kato Takahisa saw it revealing underlying societal anxiety despite modernization. Psychiatrist Shigeta Saitō called it symptomatic of the times, criticizing the "self-centered" impulse to pass on misfortune compared to earlier Lucky Letters. Sociologist Mita Munesuke termed it the "pass the buck" (ババ抜き, babanuki, like the card game Old Maid) mentality amplified. Writer Nada Inada linked it to persistent superstition in modern society and the fear triggered by confronting the taboo subject of unhappiness. Social psychologist Akira Tsujimura noted the unsettling effect of anonymity, the resonance with the ever-present reality of death, and its alignment with modern egoism. Writer Kenichi Hatsumi recalled playing "unlucky letter games" as a child, suggesting a parody element existed alongside genuine fear. Shrine priest Ishikawa Masayasu pointed out how the letters exploit psychological weakness, trapping people between spreading harm and fearing personal consequences.

===== Responses by organizations in Japan =====
Various organizations stepped in to handle the letters and alleviate public anxiety:

- Police: Efforts included public awareness campaigns (Chiba urging letters be sent to the police chief, Niigata advising disposal), setting up collection boxes (Kanagawa's "Shichifuku Post" meaning "Seven Fortunes Post," Shiga's "Purification Boxes"), issuing warnings about potential prosecution for threats (Osaka), and offering to dispose of letters brought to stations (Tokyo). However, prosecution was difficult as the content rarely met the legal definition of a threat.
- Post Offices: Initially handled refused letters as undeliverable, but later some branches actively collected them for disposal, citing inability to screen mail beforehand due to privacy laws. Initiatives included collection and incineration programs (Shiga, 1990; Saga instructing on refusal procedures; Shizuoka, 1991).
- Temples and Shrines: Many offered to collect and ritually dispose of the letters through burning ceremonies (kuyō). Notable examples include young monks at Mount Kōya (1971), Hase-dera in Tokyo (from 1977), temples in Ise (1977), temples in Matsumoto installing "Unlucky Letter Offering Boxes" (1977), Shōzō-ji temple in Tokyo (accepting mail and later email), Ikuta Shrine in Kobe (from 1970), Hikawa Shrine in Saitama (1971), and Kōfuku Shrine ("Happiness Shrine") in Hyūga, which famously offered to "turn unlucky letters into tickets to happiness" and received thousands.
- Collaboration: Some post offices partnered with temples for disposal, such as in Gifu (Hokkata Post Office sending collected letters to Tokurin-ji Temple in Nagoya for burning on Fumi no Hi (Letter Day), starting 1991) and Kōchi (Kōchi Central Post Office setting up a dedicated P.O. Box "940" - a pun on kuyō - with letters ritually burned at Chikurin-ji Temple from 1995).
- Others: Individuals publicly offered to receive letters (a Chiba salaryman collecting postmarks in 1970, a Tokyo man collecting 2000 letters by 1978). Radio host Yutaka Tonegawa invited listeners to send letters to him after hearing about a child's distress, arranging for disposal at Toyokawa Inari Tokyo Betsuin. Music magazine ARENA37°C collected letters from readers. A reader suggested an apotropaic ritual involving drawing a blue crescent moon over the address and tearing the letter into three pieces.

===== Variations and transformations in print =====
Besides the standard Fukou no Tegami, variations emerged:

- Guinness Challenge Letters: In the 1990s, some chain letters disguised themselves as attempts to set a Guinness World Record for the longest chain, sometimes falsely claiming support from Scout groups. These often still contained veiled threats of misfortune for non-participation. Guinness World Records publicly denied any involvement.
- Eveletter (エブレター, Eburetā): A variation promising romantic success or good fortune if forwarded, and misfortune or social loss if not.
- External image
  - Example of a "Stick Letter" - Hiroshi Yamamoto's SF Secret Base
  Stick Letter (棒の手紙, Bō no Tegami):
  Diagram showing the visual similarity leading to the misreading of "不幸" (fukō - unlucky) as "棒" (bō - stick) in handwritten Japanese
  A prominent mutation originating in the 1990s where the handwritten characters for "unlucky" (不幸, fukō) were misread or sloppily copied as the character for "stick" (棒, bō). Due to the instruction "do not change the text", this error was faithfully propagated, eventually becoming more common than the original "unlucky" version. These often contained specific, though fictional, details about victims (e.g., "Ms./Mr. XX of XX University was killed by Ms./Mr. XX for stopping it") and escalating requirements or warnings. Poor handwriting led to further errors, like "handwritten or copy" (手書き、コピー可) becoming "予書、ヒピーも可" (gibberish). By 1997, photocopied and word-processed versions were common, introducing new errors like typos (e.g., "I am" 私は becoming 渡しは). Writer Hiroshi Yamamoto analyzed these, noting internal contradictions (e.g., adding victim details violated the "do not change text" rule) and later fictionalized the phenomenon. Scholar Maruyama Yasuaki links the "stick" error to the increasing prevalence of horizontal writing with the rise of personal computers, making the visual confusion between the characters more likely. The "Stick Letter" faded around 1998, likely due to accumulating errors rendering it nonsensical.

=== Email ===
Some email messages sent as chain letters may seem fairly harmless; for example, a school student wishing to see how many people can receive their email for a science project, but they can grow exponentially and be hard to stop. Infamously, the salacious Claire Swire email spread in a chain-like fashion when its recipient sought to learn Swire's identity.

Messages sometimes include phony promises from companies or wealthy individuals (such as Bill Gates) promising a monetary reward to everyone who receives the message. They may also be politically motivated, such as "Save the Scouts, forward this to as many friends as possible" or a warning that a popular TV or radio show may be forced off the air. Some, such as the Hawaiian Good Luck Totem, which has spread in thousands of forms, threaten users with bad luck if not forwarded. One chain letter distributed on MSN Hotmail began, "Hey it's Tara and John the directors of MSN..." and subsequently claimed readers' accounts would be deleted if they did not pass on the message.

Another common form of email chain letter is the virus hoax and a form of cyberbullying.

==== Email chain letters in Japan ====
With the rise of email and mobile phones, digital versions of Fukou no Tegami, known as "Fukou no Mail" (不幸のメール - Unlucky Mail), emerged. Early versions in the 1990s often lacked the elaborate justifications of printed letters, simply threatening death ("コロサレル," korosareru) or dire consequences ("タイヘンナコトニナル," taihen na koto ni naru) for not forwarding. By 1995, they were reported spreading within corporate email systems. In 1999, widespread circulation via mobile phones and PHS was noted, with messages like "Send this mail to 6 people within 5 days or die," "16 people who ignored this are dead," or "You will definitely die if you read this mail to the end."

Later examples reported by the Japan Data Communication Association (DEKYO) include threats like: "My girlfriend disappeared. Forward this to 20 people to help find her. Anyone who stops the mail is the culprit and I will come kill them in 8 days," "A girl named ■■ was bullied and committed suicide. Her ghost still wanders. If you don't send this to 15+ people, she will attack you," or "My best friend ■■ betrayed me. I was hit by a car and lost both legs. Send this to 10 people in 10 hours, or I will come steal your legs." Particularly notorious were the "Kikuchi Ayane chain mail" (featuring a murdered girl's ghost seeking friends and her killer) and the "Tachibana Ayumi chain mail" (claiming a friend was murdered and the sender would use phone location data to find and kill anyone who didn't forward the mail to enough people, assuming they were the culprit), the latter appearing as early as 2001. Emails invoking revenge or ghosts seeking killers became common from late 1999 onwards, sometimes influenced by popular horror like the movie Ring, leading to "Sadako mail" threatening curses from the film's antagonist. A lighter(?) example was the "Fukou no Takagi Boo" (Unlucky Takagi Boo) mail circulating among high school girls in 1998, claiming to reveal comedian Takagi Boo's phone number and threatening weight gain if not forwarded.

Forwarding such emails could have legal consequences; in 2000, a university student in Yamaguchi Prefecture was questioned by police on suspicion of intimidation for forwarding a threatening chain mail.

In response to the prevalence of these emails, in 2005 the Japan Data Communication Association set up dedicated email addresses (advertised as a "digital trash can") where people could forward unwanted chain mails for deletion. Within months, they received tens of thousands of emails, the majority being superstition-based chain letters. Analysis in 2008 found that 78% of emails received fell into the "luck/unluck" category (though many contained links to dating or adult sites). These disposal addresses remain active. Shōzō-ji temple in Tokyo also accepts unlucky emails, printing them out for ritual disposal.

=== Web communities ===
Chain letters within social media platforms became widespread on Myspace (in the form of Myspace bulletins) and YouTube (in the form of video comments) as well as on Facebook through messages or applications. For instance, the chain post/email of Carmen Winstead, supposedly about a girl from Indiana who was pushed down a sewage drain in a fire drill, states that, "if you do not repost/send this to 10 people, Carmen will find you and kill you." Chain letters are often coupled with intimidating hoaxes or the promise of providing the sender with "secret" information once they have forwarded the message.

==== SNS and forum chain messages in Japan ====
From around 2011, email chain letters declined in Japan, while similar messages spread via SNS. On Twitter (now X), this often takes the form of pressured retweets (now reposts), while on LINE, messages urge forwarding to a specific number of contacts. Common LINE examples since 2016 include: "Copy this and send to 10 people or misfortune will befall you," or "You received this because you're important to me. Send this to 20 people you truly like. If you don't, friends or lovers will leave you." The latter type, leveraging friendship anxiety, reportedly caused real friction when recipients felt pressured to forward, annoying their contacts. Some include phone numbers to call "if you think it's fake," but these are often unrelated third-party numbers used for harassment, or sometimes linked to organized crime. Surveys indicate high exposure among Japanese teenagers, with many admitting to forwarding them. Online forums like Yahoo! Chiebukuro and Nifty Kids receive numerous相談 (sōdan - consultation) requests about these messages.

On Japanese imageboards and forums like 2channel (now 5channel), copy-paste chain messages also appear. One notable type emerged around 2002, involving narratives where the poster claims to be possessed or hunted by a malevolent entity (e.g., "Are" - "That Thing") and urges readers to spread the story to dilute the entity's focus, ending with statements like "If you want to increase your own survival probability, I recommend exposing this text to as many eyes as possible." These are sometimes called "self-responsibility type" (自己責任系, jiko sekinin kei) stories.

External image
- Image known as the "Hand of God" - Impress Watch

Since around 2007, an image known as the "Hand of God" (神の手, Kami no Te)—depicting a hand-shaped cloud with sunbeams—has circulated frequently on Twitter and LINE in Japan. Typically accompanied by text claiming that sending it to people you wish happiness upon will bring them good luck and grant wishes, the image has been flagged by security firms like G DATA Software as potentially linked to malware. (Meteorologists state such cloud formations are impossible; the image likely originated as a doctored version of a shock image from Goatse.cx.) The image gained renewed attention in 2021 when celebrities posted it on Instagram, prompting warnings. This "Hand of God" image represents a shift back towards positive "good luck" chains, albeit with potential security risks.

On TikTok, sounds tagged "#いいことが起きる" (#GoodThingsWillHappen) gained popularity around 2022-2023, particularly among Japanese high school students, promising fulfilled wishes if used in posts. These represent a further evolution towards positive, low-stakes chain-like phenomena, contrasting with the anxiety-inducing nature of Fukou no Tegami.

While digital copying allows perfect replication, potentially halting the mutation seen in handwritten letters like the "Stick Letter," new forms and variations continue to emerge across different platforms, suggesting the underlying mechanisms of chain letters constantly adapt to new media.

== Reasons for popularity ==
The enduring appeal and periodic surges in chain letter popularity have been linked to various factors:

- Societal anxiety: Periods of social unrest or uncertainty are often cited. In Japan, the 1970s Fukou no Tegami boom coincided with events like the Yodo-go hijacking, Yukio Mishima's suicide, the Sanrizuka Struggle, and the Asama-Sansō incident. Similarly, the 1920s Lucky Letter craze occurred amidst post-WWI turmoil, the 1918 Rice Riots, the Oomoto incident, and leading up to the Great Kanto Earthquake.
- Psychological factors: Exploiting common fears (misfortune, death, social exclusion) and desires (luck, wealth, connection). The act of forwarding can provide a temporary sense of control or relief from anxiety, even if illogical. Some analyses suggest Japanese cultural tendencies towards accepting fate might make such letters more potent than in some Western cultures. For children, who lack adult coping mechanisms, forwarding can be a way to displace anxiety.
- Cultural context: In Japan, a strong post-war culture of letter writing, including widespread pen pal activities among students facilitated by organizations like the "Postal Friends Association" (郵便友の会, Yūbin Tomo no Kai), may have provided fertile ground. The rise of New Age beliefs, occultism, and new religious movements in the 1990s may have coincided with later resurgences.
- Ease of transmission: The shift from laborious handwritten copies to photocopies, faxes, and especially near-costless, instant digital forwarding (email, S.M.S.) dramatically lowered the barrier to participation, enabling faster and wider spread.

== Relationship to urban legends ==
Chain letters often function as vectors for urban legends. The structure "learn this story/break this rule, suffer misfortune unless you pass it on to X people within Y time" is common to both. A prominent example is Carmen Winstead (also known as Jessica Smith), a legend that emerged on Myspace in 2006 that describes the story of a girl who was pushed down a sewer drain.

In Japan, specific urban legends are thought to be influenced by or derived from Fukou no Tegami:

- Kashima-san (カシマさん): A legend popular around 1972 involving a vengeful female ghost (often legless). Hearing the story invites her appearance, but telling it to a certain number of people within a set time (e.g., 3 days) transfers the curse. Early media reports explicitly compared Kashima-san to "Lucky Letters" (likely meaning the Fukou no Tegami type prevalent then), calling it a "word-of-mouth version". Some researchers propose Kashima-san originated as a narrative justification for the misfortune threatened by Fukou no Tegami, which then detached from the physical letter format as it spread orally.
- Sacchan (サッちゃん): A late 1990s chain mail legend claiming the popular children's song "Sacchan" has a hidden fourth verse revealing the titular girl died in a train accident in Hokkaido. Learning this verse supposedly brings a curse, avoidable only by telling five people within three hours. (The song's actual lyricist denied this backstory).

The structural similarity—a contagious curse requiring propagation for the host's salvation—strongly suggests these legends adapted the chain letter mechanism.

== In popular culture ==
Chain letters, particularly the Fukou no Tegami type, have appeared in various fictional works, often reflecting societal awareness and anxieties surrounding them.

- In Fujiko F. Fujio's manga Doraemon, the 1977 story "Fukou no Tegami Dōkōkai" (不幸の手紙同好会 - Unlucky Letter Fan Club) features Nobita receiving a Fukou no Tegami. Distraught about passing on misfortune, he is helped by Doraemon, who uses a gadget (the "Postal Reverse Detector") to identify the sender (Suneo) and turn the tables. Educational analyses of this story discuss the ethics of chain letters and compare Nobita's distress with Doraemon's dismissal as representing valid responses.
- In Fujiko Fujio A's manga Matarō ga Kuru!!, the story "Fukou no Tegami nado Kowakunai!!" (不幸の手紙などこわくない!! - Unlucky Letters Aren't Scary!) sees the bullied protagonist Mataro use supernatural powers to take revenge on the sender. Both Doraemon and Mataro portray bullied children overcoming the letter via extraordinary means, possibly reflecting the authors' own experiences with bullying.
- In Jiro Tsunoda's manga Kyōfu Shinbun (恐怖新聞 - Terror Newspaper), the episode "Fukou no Tegami" depicts a boy who sends unlucky letters being punished by a ghost. Notably, while using a supernatural element for retribution, the story strongly dismisses the power of the letters themselves as "lies" and "nonsense", urging readers not to believe in them. Both Fujiko works and Tsunoda's story ultimately condemn the letters and punish those who propagate them, perhaps reflecting the creators' desire to dispel children's fears.
- In Fujio Akatsuka's manga Tensai Bakabon, the 1974 story "Fukō no Pīnattsu no Tegami desu no da" (不幸のピーナッツの手紙ですのだ - It's the Unlucky Peanut Letter!) features letters accompanied by peanuts that supposedly cause death if eaten within 48 hours. (The story included a disclaimer that it was fiction and unrelated to any real peanuts, possibly anticipating complaints. Coincidentally, "peanuts" became slang for bribes during the Lockheed bribery scandals two years later).
- In Momoko Sakura's manga Chibi Maruko-chan, the story "Maruko Fukō no Tegami o Morau" (まる子 不幸の手紙をもらう - Maruko Gets an Unlucky Letter) shows the protagonist terrified after receiving one, until her father dismisses it and tears it up. Given the setting and author's age, this likely reflects experiences from the 1970s boom. Some commentators view the father's direct action as the best real-world response.
- The plot device in Koji Suzuki's novel Ring (and its adaptations), where watching a cursed videotape leads to death unless the viewer makes a copy and shows it to someone else, shares the core structure of chain letters: propagation is necessary to escape personal harm. This similarity has been widely noted by critics, and the novel itself makes the comparison. The film's popularity reportedly influenced the framing of "unlucky emails" in the late 1990s, with recipients describing them as "like Ring" and specific "Sadako mail" variants emerging.

== See also ==
- Copypasta
- Gratis Internet
- Jessica Mydek hoax letter
- Mail and wire fraud
- Make money fast
- Multi-level marketing
- Postcrossing
- Spam
- Virus hoax

=== Similar distribution ===
- Faxlore – distribution of chain-letters or similar material by fax machine
