= Telephone network =

Network for carrying telephone calls

A telephone network is a telecommunications network that connects telephones to support calls between them that facilitate human communication. The technology eventually came to be used for communication between humans and machines (i.e. fax and dial-up Internet access) although today this has been replaced with digital technologies.

The world was transformed in the 1920s as the phone became ubiquitous, with people sharing news, ideas, and personal information. During the 1990s, the phone helped transform the world again with the advent of computers, sophisticated communication devices, and via dial-up internet.

There are a number of types of telephone network:

Landline network
Telephones must be hard-wired to a telephone exchange. This is known as the public switched telephone network (PSTN).

Wireless network
Telephones are mobile; one can move around within the coverage area.

Private network
A group of telephones are connected primarily to each other and use a gateway to reach the outside world. This is usually used inside a company and a call center and is called a private branch exchange (PBX).

Integrated Services Digital Network (ISDN)
A standard for transmitting voice, data, and video over traditional telephone lines using digital signals.

A telephone company owns and builds landline and wireless networks and provides services to the public under license from the national government. A mobile virtual network operators leases capacity wholesale from a telephone company and sells telephony service to the public directly.

== See also ==
- Telephone service (disambiguation)
