= Shotgun email =

Method of emailing

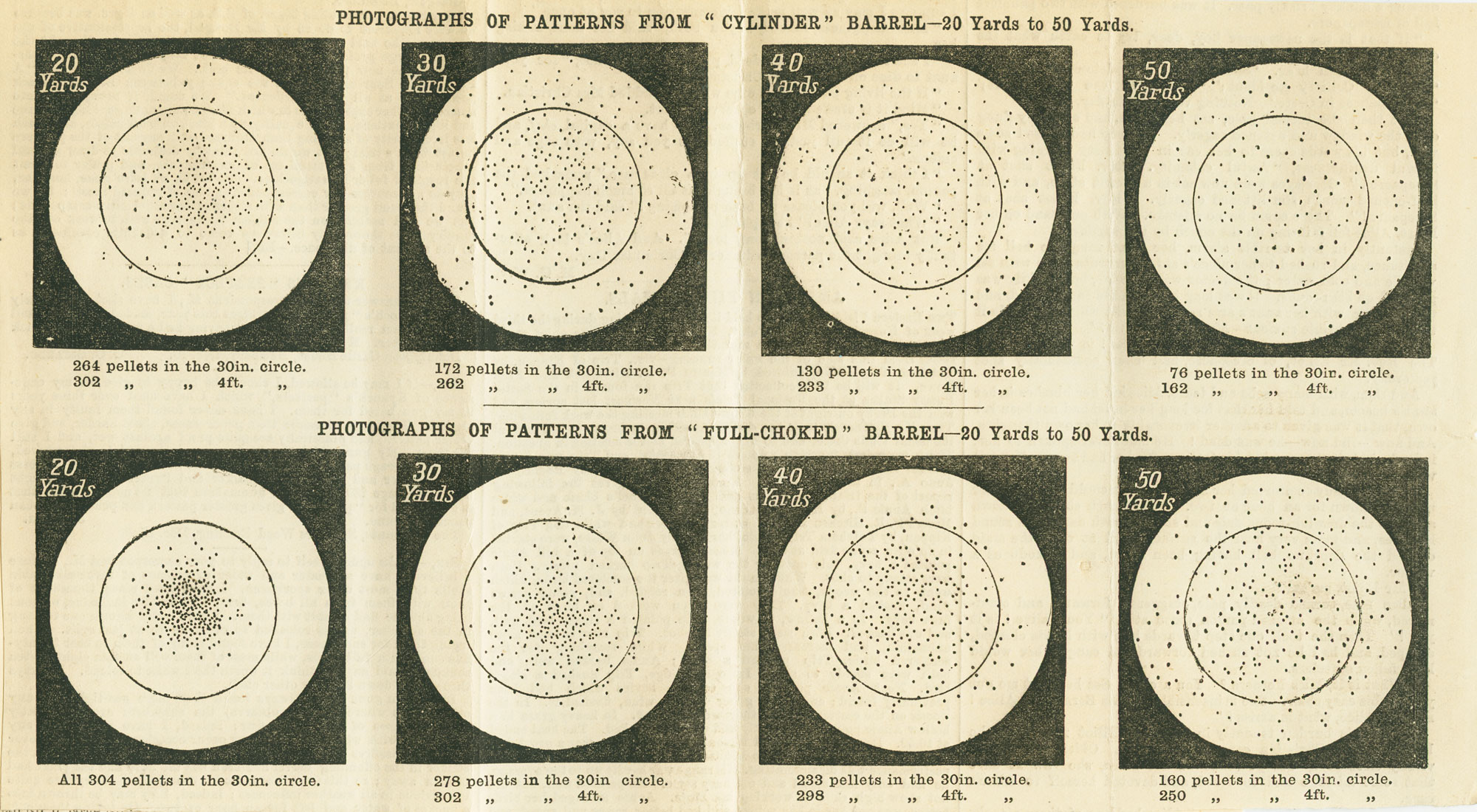
The metaphor relates the multiple pieces of shot in a shotgun shell to the various emails received as consequence of a sender addressing many recipients

A shotgun email is one that requests information or action that only requires the efforts of one person but is sent to multiple people in an effort to guarantee that at least one person will respond. The shotgun email often results in multiple people responding to something already accomplished, and therefore results in a loss of overall productivity. Shotgun emailing is considered poor internet etiquette.

An example would be a person of authority in a business organization sending out an email to five technicians in the information technology department of his company to let them know his printer is broken. One technician responds with an on-site call and fixes the problem. Later in the day, other technicians follow-up to fix the printer that is already back in order. Shotgun emails can also be request for information or other tasks.

The blind shotgun email occurs when the sender uses the blind carbon copy feature of an email program to hide the fact that a shotgun email is in use.

== See also ==
- Email spam
- Netiquette
