= Cabal =

Clever scheme or artful plot, usually crafted for evil purposes

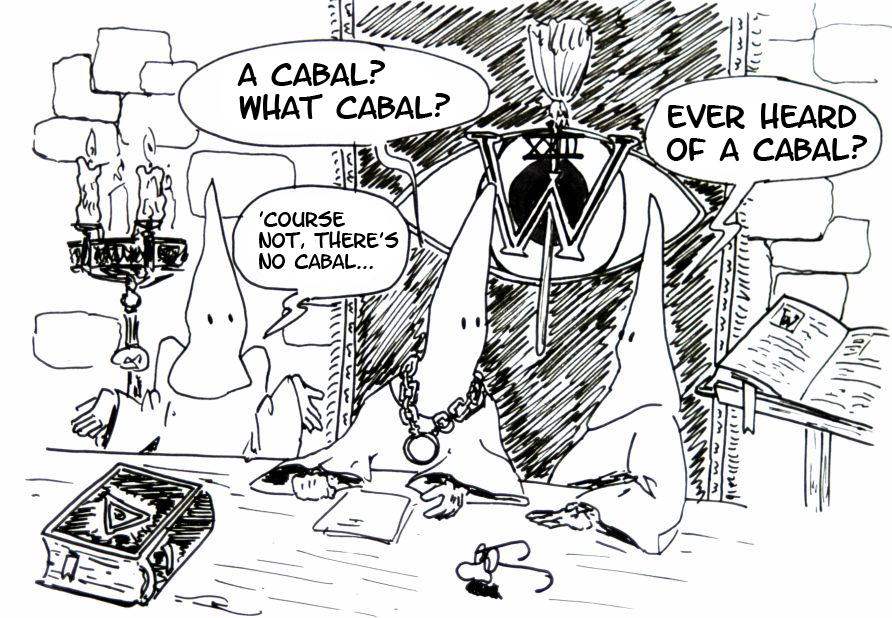
A humorous cartoon depicting a cabal

A cabal is a group of people who are united in some close design, usually to promote their private views or interests in an ideology, a state, or another community, often by intrigue and usually without the knowledge of those who are outside their group. The use of this term usually carries negative connotations of political purpose, conspiracy and secrecy. It can also refer to a secret plot or a clique, or it may be used as a verb (to form a cabal or secretly conspire).

== Etymology ==
The term cabal is derived from Kabbalah (a word that has numerous spelling variations), the Jewish mystical interpretation of the Hebrew scripture (קַבָּלָה). In Hebrew, it means "received doctrine" or "tradition", while in European culture (Christian Cabala, Hermetic Qabalah) it became associated with occult doctrine or a secret.

It came into English via the French cabale from the medieval Latin cabbala and was known early in the 17th century through usages linked to King Charles II and Oliver Cromwell, the Lord Protector. By the middle of the 17th century, it had developed further to mean some intrigue entered into by a small group and also referred to the group of people so involved, i.e. a semi-secret political clique.

There is a theory that the term took on its present meaning from a group of ministers formed in 1668 – the "Cabal ministry" of King Charles II. Members included Sir Thomas Clifford, Lord Arlington, the Duke of Buckingham, Lord Ashley and Lord Lauderdale, whose initial letters coincidentally spelt CABAL, and who were the signatories of the public Treaty of Dover that allied England to France in a prospective war against the Netherlands and served as a cover for the Secret Treaty of Dover. The theory that the word originated as an acronym from the names of the group of ministers is a folk etymology, although the coincidence was noted at the time and could possibly have popularised its use.

== Usage in the Netherlands ==
In Dutch, the word kabaal, also kabale or cabale, was used during the 18th century in the same way. The Friesche Kabaal (Frisian Cabal) denoted the Frisian pro-Orange nobility which supported the stadholderate, but also had great influence on stadtholders Willem IV and Willem V and their regents, and therefore on the matters of state in the Dutch Republic. This influence came to an end when the major Frisian nobles at the court fell out of favor. The word nowadays has the meaning of noise, uproar, racket. It was derived as such from French and mentioned for the first time in 1845.

== Conspiratorial discourse ==
The term is sometimes employed as an antisemitic dog whistle due to its evocation of centuries-old antisemitic tropes.

Followers of the QAnon conspiracy theory use "The Cabal" to refer to what is perceived as a secret worldwide elite organization who, according to proponents, wish to undermine democracy and freedom, and implement their own globalist agendas.

Some anti-government movements in Australia, particularly those that emerged during Canberra's response to the pandemic, claimed that Scott Morrison's secret ministerial appointments were evidence of a "secret cabal".

== See also ==
- Camarilla
- Clandestine cell system
- Clique
- Club
- Collusion
- Cronyism
- Cult
- Elitism
- Firm
- Gang
- Group narcissism
- Mobbing
- Nepotism
- Obscurantism
- Power behind the throne
- Social group
- The Establishment
- There Is No Cabal
