= Jessica Mydek hoax letter =

Widely-disseminated chain letter

The Jessica Mydek hoax was a popular chain letter, circulated by hoaxsters, to play on the sympathy of credulous readers, and get them to respond, so as to build a sucker list. The letter was first observed in 1997.

== The hoax ==
The letter represented itself as a letter from a seven-year-old girl with terminal brain cancer. She requested the email be forwarded to the recipients' email contacts, with a carbon copy to an email address the letter represented as that of the American Cancer Society. The American Cancer Society denied involvement in the campaign and determined there was no such child.

The letter promised readers that the American Cancer Society had corporate donors who would donate three cents for every carbon copy of the campaign letter forwarded to a new person.

== Impact ==
According to Theresa Heyd, author of Email Hoaxes: Form, Function, Genre Ecology, the Mydek hoax letter had the three classic elements scholars recognize in a sympathy hoax letter: the "hook", the "threat", and the "request". Heyd points out that the name "Jessica Mydek", when read aloud, is a "rude onomastic pun"—another marker of hoax letters.

Heyd asserts that the Mydek letter is the first instance of an email hoax to request those forwarding it to also forward a copy to a specific email address—enabling the hoaxer to engage in email address harvesting of the contacts of those who fall for the hoax.

This hoax was also used as an example of a typical cancer victim hoax in several computer security textbooks.

Samantha Miller, author of E-Mail Etiquette: Do's, Don'ts and Disaster Tales from People Magazine's Internet, called Jessica Mydek hoax letters "a classic of the genre".
