= Pink contract =

Agreement between a spammer and their ISP

A pink contract is an agreement between an email spammer and the spammer's Internet service provider. The contract exempts the spammer from the provider's terms of service, which typically prohibit spamming. In return, the spammer pays far more money for an internet connection than non-spammers.

The contract is called pink because that is the color of SPAM (the food), alluding to the fact that the contract enables spamming.
