= Nada Inada =

Nada Inada (なだ いなだ; 8 June 1929 – 6 June 2013) was the pen-name of a Japanese psychiatrist, writer and literary critic active in late Shōwa period and early Heisei period Japan. His pen name is from the Spanish language phrase "nada y nada".

== Biography ==
Nada was born in the Magome district of Tokyo, but was raised for part of his youth in Sendai. He graduated from the Medical School of Keio University. One of his fellow students was Kita Morio, who encouraged his interest in literature and in the French language. He later traveled to France on a government scholarship. His wife was French.

Nada's medical specialty was psychiatry, particularly in the treatment of alcoholism, and he was head of the Substance Abuse Department of National Hospital located in Yokosuka, Kanagawa.

One of his early novels, Retort, was nominated for the prestigious Akutagawa Prize.
