= Spamware =

Spamware is software designed by or for spammers. Spamware varies widely, but may include the ability to import thousands of addresses, to generate random addresses, to insert fraudulent headers into messages, to use dozens or hundreds of mail servers simultaneously, and to make use of open relays. Being an automated software it can create e-mail broadcasting hub by establishing superiority in numbers and sending capability as well as brings a position of great disturbance to its target. Normally, applications can be found in various online based chat rooms like Nimbuzz. The sale of spamware is illegal in eight U.S. states.

Another type of spamware is software used to search for e-mail addresses to build lists of e-mail addresses to be used either for spamming directly or to be sold to spammers.

== See also ==
- E-mail spam
