= Gratis Internet =

Referral marketing company that rewards customers with products of high-demand

Gratis Internet Logo

Gratis Internet was an American referral marketing company based in Washington D.C. that rewarded customers with technological consumer products of high-demand such as the iPod and PlayStation 3. In 2004, it became a member of the Inc. 500 and in 2005 ranked eighteenth. Its name comes from the Latin word Gratis, meaning "free of charge". The company stopped operating entirely or was bought by another company around 2010.

Following its rise and eventual closure, Gratis Internet was a subject of repeated criticism for its false advertising in regards to products it offered being entirely "free" and general business structure that, as a referral system, was by design an unsustainable pyramid scheme where only early adopters could profit in short term.

== History ==
FreePay Logo

Gratis Internet was established in 2001. By July 2004, it launched a number of Web sites offering free merchandise, most notably iPods, to users who register and complete membership requirements.

Although the word "free" is used prominently, would-be members seeking to complete an offer to qualify for the free merchandise are often given a number of options, some of which involve signing up and paying for a service or subscription. Gratis websites were launched in the United States, United Kingdom, Canada, Germany, and Australia.

Gratis's revenue in 2004 was US$20.5 million, according to Inc.com. Inc.com also reported that Gratis Internet had only 12 employees.

FreePay became the brand name for all of Gratis Internet's websites in August 2005, including the original FreeCondoms.com and FreeIpods.com..

In March 2006, New York Attorney General Eliot Spitzer filed suit against the company, alleging that it sold personal information obtained from millions of consumers despite a strict promise of confidentiality. The suit followed a $1.1 million settlement by Datran Media, which had obtained 7.2 million names, e-mail addresses, home phone numbers, and street addresses from Gratis Internet. Gratis co-founder Peter Martin disputed that his company ever sold or rented out customer information, saying that it hired Datran Media to work on creative design and back-office support for its e-mail marketing campaigns.

In May 2006, Gratis Internet announced new terms of service, allowing users only three months to complete an offer and refer five friends.

In February 2010, a Gratis Internet spinout called Social Cash, an advertising network for Facebook applications, was purchased by LifeStreet Media, of San Carlos, Calif., for an undisclosed sum.

== Complaints ==
In September 2004, the company was criticized by customers for failing to ship iPods, and for inundating them with additional spam e-mail. The company said it was shipping iPods, but that they could not get enough from Apple Computer to fill the demand. The co-founders, Peter Martin and Rob Jewell, denied giving customer e-mail information to third-party companies, but admitted customers do receive a small number of messages from select parties. "We warn our users they may get some messages from our marketing partners", Jewell said.

As of November 2008, the company had an unsatisfactory record with the Better Business Bureau due to unanswered complaints. In the 36 months prior to November 2008, the Bureau had processed 848 complaints about Gratis Internet.

== FreePay process ==
In order to receive the advertised "free gift" at each of Gratis' websites, a visitor is required to register and complete one affiliate offer. Affiliates include AOL, Blockbuster, RealNetworks, casino and credit card offers, and others. The affiliate offers typically consist of trial memberships, service subscriptions, credit card applications and the like; some require credit cards during registration, and a few involve payment of some kind, causing critics to claim the "free" label a misnomer.

The visitor is then required to refer a set number of people, which varies by the product (the number required is usually the MSRP of the gift divided by US$50). A valid referral is one which has both completed registration via a referral link and signed up for an affiliate offer. Each referral must be a unique user or the account will be "put on hold" during the approval process. Because sponsors must acknowledge the completion of their offer, they are willing to invest more for each referral than they might for other, more traditional forms of advertising.

The advertisers pay Gratis for the referral, between $25 and $90, though the company did not release information as to specific numbers. For example: assuming the MSRP of an iPod is $250, five affiliate signups (the number needed for one user to redeem a free iPod) nets Gratis between $150 and $540. Per the program's terms, Gratis does not need to deliver an iPod to any member with four or fewer referrals.

Following the creation of Gratis Internet, similar companies were created offering similar incentives for completed offers. Gratis Internet and its initial service, FreeCondoms.com are credited with creating the incentive marketing industry.

== See also ==
- Free lunch
- Tanstaafl
