= Nancy Friedman =

American customer service and telephone skills consultant

Nancy J. Friedman
- Occupation: Customer service consultant
- Years active: 1982–present
- Organization: Telephone Doctor
- Known for: Telephone skills training
- Spouse: Dick Friedman
- Children: David, Linda

Nancy J. Friedman (born 1939/1940) is an American customer service and telephone skills consultant. She is also known as her business persona the "Telephone Doctor"

Nancy Friedman is founder and president of Telephone Doctor, a customer-service training company based in St. Louis, Missouri. She also appears as spokesperson in the company's video training programs. Friedman controls the registered trademark and dotcom domain for "Telephone Doctor".

== Biography ==
Friedman and her husband, Dick Friedman, were originally from Chicago. Friedman has one year of college from the University of Miami. Friedman worked as an actress in San Diego in the 1960s. In 1964, she and her husband bought a radio station and then in 1967, they bought another radio station in St. Louis, Missouri. In 1967, she and her husband moved to St. Louis. In St. Louis, she did promotions for a weather-forecast service, Weatherline, which she started up with her husband in 1968. She also continued to act, doing several shows a year and winning the Golden Globe Atlas Award for "best comedy actress."

== Career ==
In 1982, after being treated rudely in a routine call to her insurance agent, Friedman both canceled her policies and started the "desk drawer" one-woman business Telephone Doctor to train employees in telephone etiquette. The insurer company asked "how it should be done" and invited Friedman to demonstrate polite customer service to its representatives, leading to Friedman providing customer-service seminars to other corporations and associations. Friedman's first seminar earned 38 cents in profit. "Telephone Doctor" was named by Friedman's second client, a Davenport, Iowa newspaper editor.

The company, Telephone Doctor, was founded by Friedman in 1983. By 1986, her business, co-owned with her husband, Dick Friedman and her son, David, was a subsidiary of Weatherline and Sportsline. By 1987, she was doing three to four seminars a week. She and her husband began creating training videos because she didn't have enough time to do all the seminars people were asking for. By 1994, Telephone Doctor employed 23 staff members and had annual worldwide sales of $2 million. The company moved to a new building with a theater that same year. Also in 1994, the company acquired World Telecom Associates.

The company also did surveys to find out what phrases frustrated callers the most. Friedman tried going on television to increase her business's exposure, but later found that creating close relationships with clients worked better for her type of business. In 2007, the company made $3 million.

Friedman's desire to teach businesses how to make better use of the telephone rather than to take it for granted has been called a "crusade" and a "quest to stamp out phone rudeness". She explains that bad customer service translates into lower sales and lost business of hundreds of millions of dollars. Friedman is a speaker at corporate seminars in the U.S. She has been a keynote speaker at Fortune 500 and other corporate and association meetings. Her practices were recommended by Bear Stearns chairman Alan C. Greenberg for implementation by all employees.

== Books ==
- Customer Service Nightmares: 100 Tales of the Worst Experiences Possible, and how They Could Have Been Fixed (1998)
- Telephone Skills from A to Z: The Telephone Doctor Phone Book (2000)
- Telemarketing Tips from A to Z: How to Make Every Call a Winner!. Menlo, California: Crisp Publications. 2001. ISBN 978-1-56052-603-2.
- Excuses, Excuses, Excuses ... (2001)
- 50 Little Tips That Make a Big Difference. St. Louis, MO: Independent Publishing Corp. 2005. ISBN 978-1-893937-25-3.
- How to Get Your Customers Swearing By You, Not At You: Telephone Doctor's Guide to Customer Service Training. Amherst, MA: HRD Press. 2008. ISBN 978-1-59996-151-4.
- 54 Golden Nuggets: The Best of the Telephone Doctor. Amherst, MA: HRD Press, Inc. 2011. ISBN 978-1-59996-255-9.
