= Irungu =

Irungu is a surname. Notable people with the surname include:

- Bernard Ngumba Irungu (born 1976), Kenyan amateur boxer
- Joshua Irungu (born 1970), Kenyan politician and community development specialist
- Lorna Irungu (1970–2021), Kenyan television presenter
- Polly Irungu, Kenyan-American photographer and journalist

== See also ==
- Irungu Kang'ata, Kenyan politician
