= UC Berkeley School of Law =

Public law school in Berkeley, California

Coordinates: 37.86986°N 122.25339°W

University of California, Berkeley School of Law
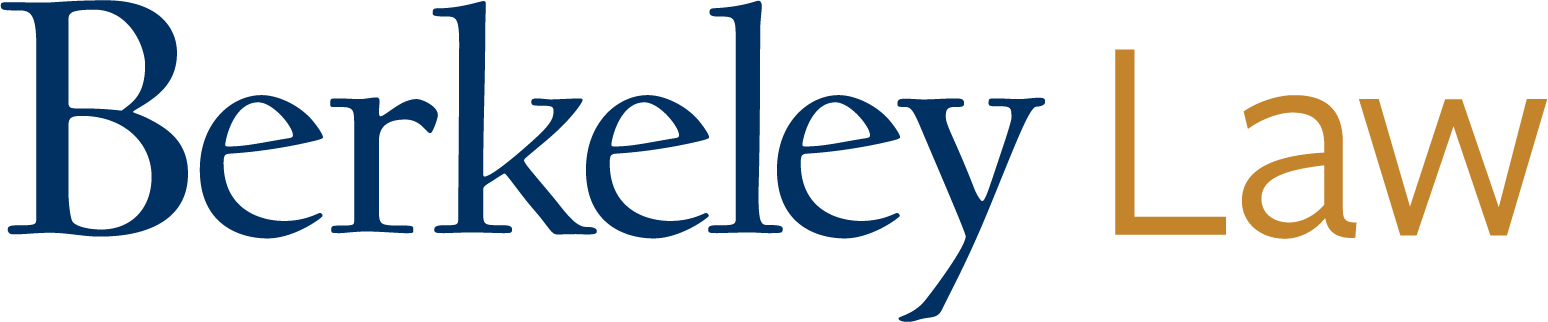
- Motto: Fiat lux (Latin); Let there be light (English)
- Parent school: University of California, Berkeley
- Established: November 12, 1912; 113 years ago
- School type: Public law school
- Parent endowment: $7.4 billion (2023)
- Dean: Erwin Chemerinsky
- Location: Berkeley, California, U.S.
- Enrollment: 916
- Faculty: 119 (full- and part-time)
- USNWR ranking: 16th (tie) (2026)
- Bar pass rate: 95.5% (2021)
- Website: law.berkeley.edu
- ABA profile: Standard 509 Report

The University of California, Berkeley, School of Law (Berkeley Law) is the law school of the University of California, Berkeley. The school was commonly referred to as "Boalt Hall" for many years, although it was never the official name. This came from its initial building, the Boalt Memorial Hall of Law, named for John Henry Boalt. This name was transferred to an entirely new law school building in 1951 but was removed in 2020.

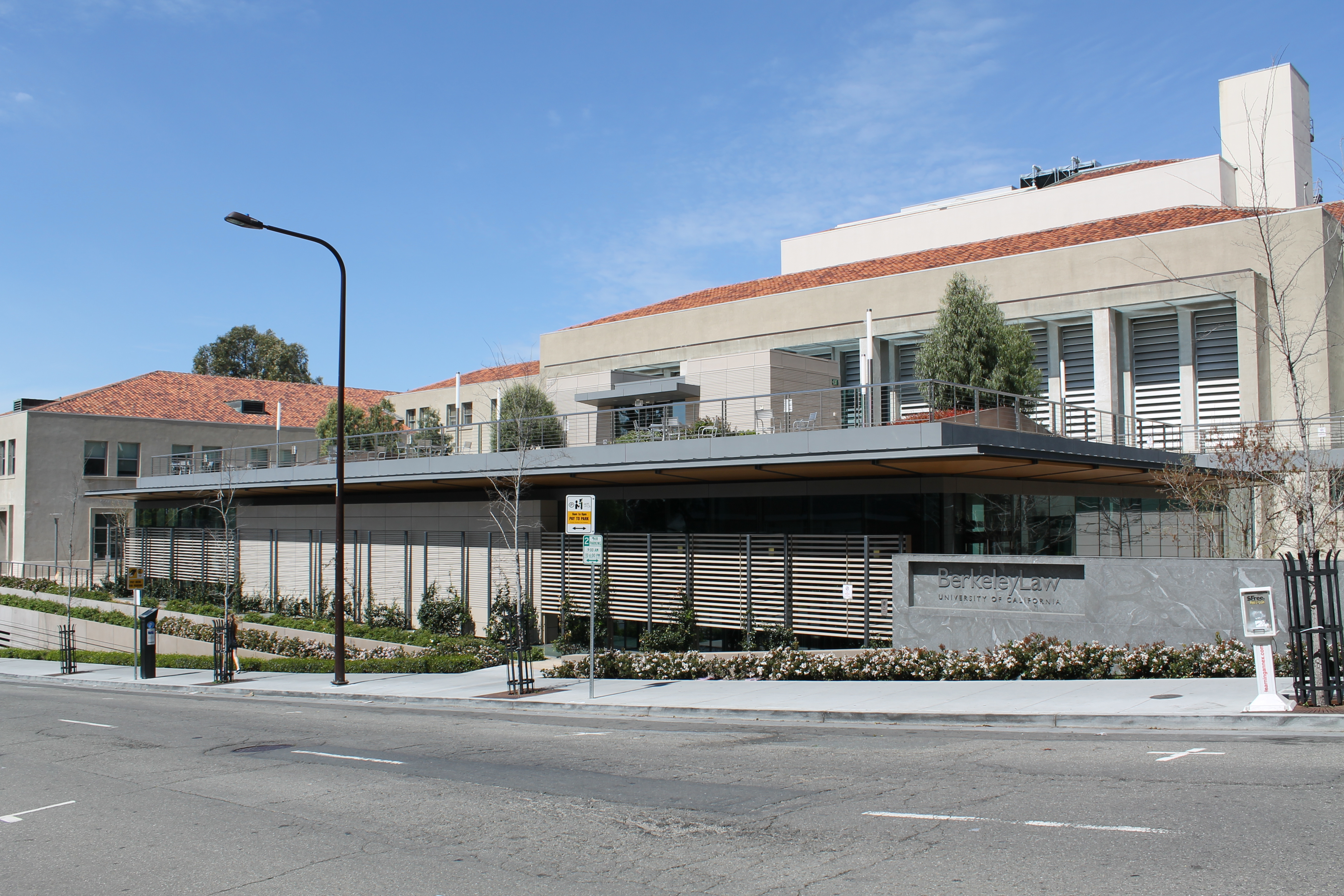
The Law Building and the South Pavilion (in foreground), which was completed in 2011.

In 2019, 98 percent of graduates obtained full-time employment within nine months, with a median salary of $190,000. Of all the law schools in California, Berkeley had the highest bar passage rates in 2021 (95.5%) and 2022 (92.2%). The school offers J.D., LL.M., J.S.D. and Ph.D. degrees, and enrolls approximately 320 to 330 J.D. students in each entering class, annually, with each class being further broken down into smaller groups that take courses together.

Berkeley Law alumni include notable federal judges, politicians, Fortune 500 executives, noted legal academics and civil rights experts. Prominent alumni include Chief Justice of the United States Earl Warren, U.S. secretary of state Dean Rusk, U.S. attorney general Edwin Meese, U.S. secretary of the treasury and Chair of the Federal Reserve G. William Miller, President of the International Court of Justice Joan Donoghue, Mayor of San Francisco Ed Lee, Dallas Mavericks CEO Terdema Ussery, and Nuremberg trials prosecutor Whitney Robson Harris.

== History ==
=== Department of Jurisprudence ===
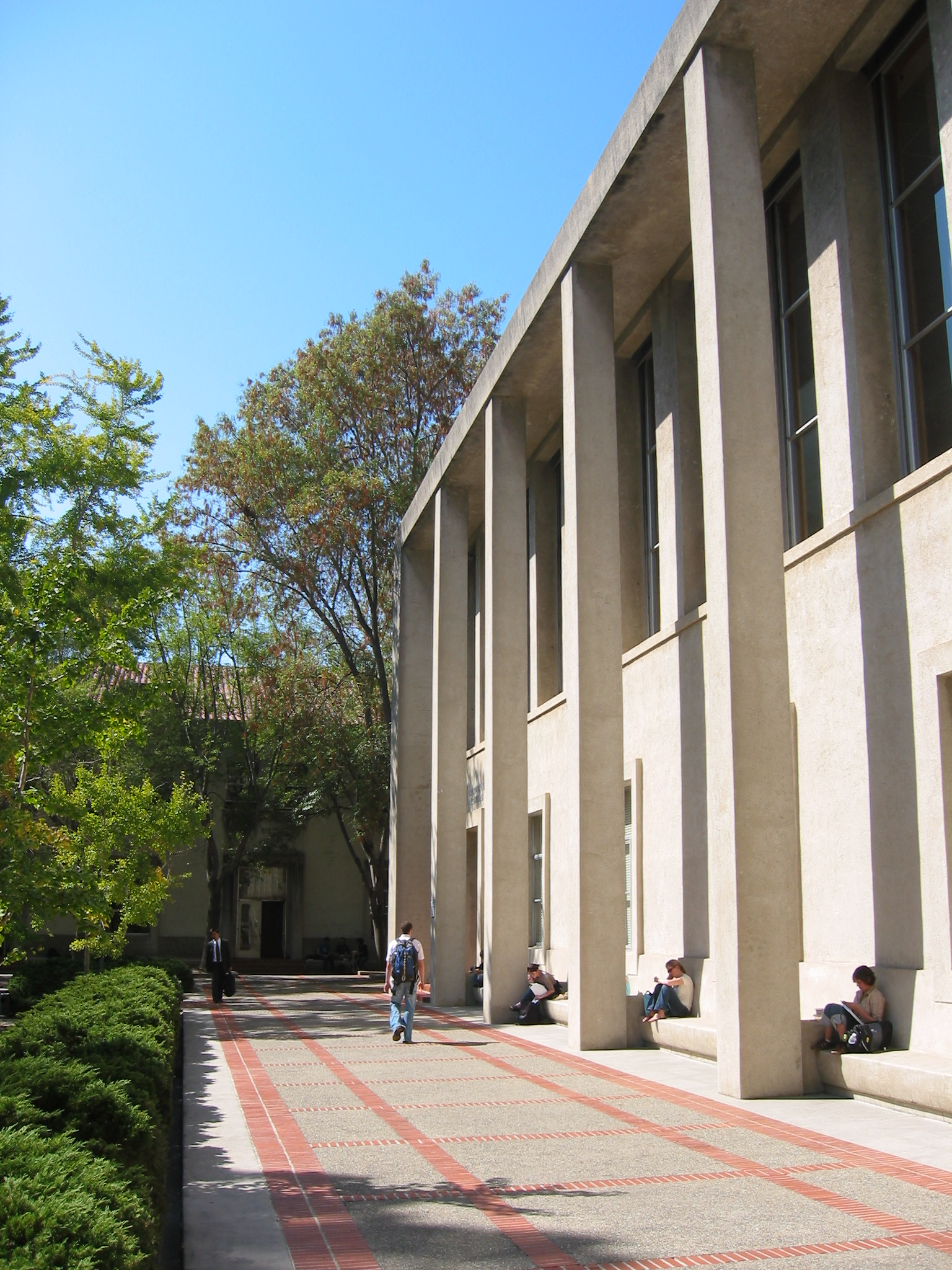
The south side of the Law Building in 2006, before the South Pavilion was constructed.

The school that is today known as Berkeley Law originated in 1894 as the Department of Jurisprudence of the University of California. On August 17, 1894, the Regents of the University of California approved a resolution for transmission to President Martin Kellogg which directed that the "branch of study" already under the supervision of Professor William Carey Jones was to be separated from the Department of History and Political Science "and formed into a new department embracing: (1) Constitutional Law of the United States, (2) International Law, (3) Roman Law, and (4) Jurisprudence". This resolution had emerged from a subcommittee of the Board of Regents whose members were all lawyers.

Jones personally taught all the new department's courses for the first three years. According to Jones, the inspiration for the department came from his experience in 1882 teaching a course in Roman law to Berkeley seniors. Jones envisioned that the new department would be less vocational and more academic in comparison to the existing Hastings College of the Law in San Francisco. Initially, the department was merely intended to broaden Berkeley undergraduates' academic knowledge of the law. Students who wished to learn how to actually practice law were referred to Hastings, where coursework already completed at Berkeley could count towards earning Hastings law degrees.

In 1901, the number of faculty was increased to six by the hiring of one lecturer and two instructors, which enabled the department to offer courses adding up to two years of instruction. In 1902, the addition of four more lecturers enabled the department to provide a complete three-year law program and the referrals to Hastings were discontinued. On June 26, 1902, newspapers in San Francisco and Oakland reported that there was now a "complete law school" at Berkeley, whose graduates would be eligible to immediately apply for admission to the California bar without having to take additional courses at Hastings. The department awarded its first law degrees in 1903 to three men, one of whom was journalist and labor activist Motoyuki Negoro. In 1906, Emmy Marcuse was the first woman to earn a law degree from the department.

These fortuitous developments at Berkeley were also a great catastrophe for Hastings. Both law schools had started with one full-time law professor aided by part-time instructors who were practicing lawyers, but only Berkeley made the rapid transition to hiring enough full-time lecturers and professors to teach the majority of its courses and then tightened up its requirements for student admissions and faculty hiring. Berkeley quickly eclipsed Hastings and pushed the older law school into a severe decline which lasted over four decades.

The law that affiliated Hastings with UC states: "The college is affiliated with the University of California, and is the law department thereof." According to UCLA political science professor J.A.C. Grant, the law school at Berkeley was euphemistically labeled a department (or later, school) of jurisprudence for decades because it was believed UC could have only one "law department."

On January 17, 1911, the department began holding classes in the newly constructed Boalt Memorial Hall of Law at the center of the main UC Berkeley campus (now Durant Hall), and it was formally dedicated on April 28, 1911. This building was completed in 1911 with funds partially obtained from a donation of San Francisco land made by Elizabeth Josselyn Boalt in memory of her late husband, John Henry Boalt, an attorney who had resided in Oakland, California until his death in 1901.

=== School of Jurisprudence ===
As the Department of Jurisprudence at Berkeley began to rise in prestige, and Hastings began to fall, the students, faculty, and alumni of the department became quite vocal about turning the department into a real law school. The department was already distinguished enough by August 1912 to obtain admission to the Association of American Law Schools, even though it was not yet formally denominated as a law school and was still a mere department within the College of Letters. On November 12, 1912, the Board of Regents voted to approve the recommendation of a special committee made up of attorney regents for the organization of a School of Jurisprudence at Berkeley. Jones was appointed as the first dean of the new school. He continued to serve in that capacity until his retirement on June 30, 1923.

After World War I ended in 1918, a wave of young people flooded into American law schools, and by 1921, enrollment had grown to 285. This proved to be too much for the school's beautiful but tiny Beaux-Arts building, with everyone from the dean on down complaining incessantly for three decades about extreme overcrowding in Boalt Hall. The Great Depression caused even more young people to seek refuge from the economic crisis in law school, with enrollment reaching 297. By 1946, enrollment had stabilized at 275, but this was still far too many people for Boalt Hall. Other California law schools started to expand rapidly during and after World War II, but the School of Jurisprudence desperately needed to replace its building first.

In 1946, planning began for a new law school building in the southeastern corner of the Berkeley campus at Bancroft Way and College Avenue. This project had to compete for funding against many other campus projects which had been severely delayed by the Great Depression and then World War II. When it turned out the $1.35 million allocated by the state government would be insufficient, the School of Jurisprudence raised $885,000 from private sources to make up the difference.

=== School of Law ===
After World War II, the greatest problem facing the School of Jurisprudence was the considerable political pressure to ease up on admissions standards and grow larger to accommodate a surge of interest in legal careers from G.I. Bill veterans and baby boomers. Hastings underwent rapid expansion to meet this demand, while in 1947, Southern Californians finally succeeded in persuading the state legislature to appropriate over a million dollars for the construction of a law school at the University of California, Los Angeles. The faculty at Berkeley came to understand that these developments were beneficial—in that they relieved pressure to compromise on their standards—which explains why they later supported and worked on the creation of another UC law school at Davis during the 1960s. It was Berkeley's ability to hold the line on its elitist standards which led to its ascent to the top tier of American law schools by the 1990s.

The founding of the UCLA School of Law greatly affected the existing School of Jurisprudence at Berkeley. The general pattern was that UCLA Law managed to secure to itself this or that privilege, and then either the privilege also happened to inure to Berkeley's benefit, or Berkeley insisted on parity and got it.

The most important one was the right to be formally called a law school. In 1948, William Lloyd Prosser visited UCLA after he was selected to become the next dean at Berkeley—but before formally assuming office—in order to assist with the planning for UCLA Law. During his visit, Prosser heard from Grant about how a bill had been passed to create a "school of law" at UCLA even though Hastings was supposed to be the UC "law department" and decided that Berkeley could get away with the same thing. Although Berkeley and Hastings were notorious for their coldly distant relationship, Prosser and the dean at Hastings, David E. Snodgrass, had been friends since their days as classmates at Harvard College. Thus, Snodgrass openly supported Berkeley's name change and Prosser agreed to not challenge legislative appropriations for Hastings. Effective July 1, 1950, the School of Jurisprudence became the School of Law.

The California Law Review was historically run as a nonprofit corporation independent of the School of Jurisprudence which relied largely on income from subscriptions and advertising. By 1948, this income was insufficient in the face of postwar inflation, and the law review was running up a budget deficit. L. Dale Coffman, UCLA Law's first dean, initially proposed in 1950 that either Berkeley and UCLA could produce a joint law review, or that all the state's law schools could join forces to produce a single law review. After Berkeley rejected both proposals, Coffman persuaded the board of regents in 1952 to provide a full subsidy for the UCLA Law Review, and then in 1953, Berkeley demanded and obtained a similar subsidy for the California Law Review, which became a regular budget item for the law school.

Through his alliance with the conservative regents who had hired him, Coffman was able to secure an unusual amount of autonomy for the law faculty at Los Angeles from the Academic Senate with respect to appointments, courses, and budgets. However, the resulting 1952 amendments to the regents' standing orders were so broadly worded as to affect all UC professional schools offering courses only at the graduate level. The amendments greatly benefited the law faculty at Berkeley by granting them similar autonomy, but also engendered intense resentment towards them from the faculty of all other academic units at the Berkeley campus—who proceeded to strip the law faculty of the right to sit on any Academic Senate committee with power over appointments, courses, or budgets outside of the law school. The deep rupture between the law and non-law faculty caused great consternation for Clark Kerr throughout his term as Berkeley chancellor, as well as his early years as university president. It was not until 1961 that a satisfactory compromise was reached by which the School of Law faculty were restored to full Senate membership.

=== A new building ===
While UCLA Law was indirectly wreaking all this havoc on its northern sibling, the new law building at Berkeley was under construction. The law school moved into its new building in fall 1951. The formal dedication ceremony was delayed to March 18, 1952, in order to take place as part of the festivities leading up to the celebration of Charter Day on March 23. The new law building was dedicated as the new Boalt Hall. The old law building was renamed Durant Hall. After housing the East Asian Library for five decades, it was renovated in 2010 to house the offices of the deans of the College of Letters and Science.

A widely circulated but probably apocryphal story is that the original plans provided for the new law building's main facade, main entrance, and library windows to face west along a north–south axis along College Avenue, which was permanently closed north of Bancroft Way for the new project. Much of the upper level of the law building would have enjoyed a view of San Francisco Bay. (The building to the west that now obstructs that view did not exist in 1951.) However, the project went awry when the local Zeta Psi fraternity refused to leave its fraternity house at 2251 College Avenue at the north end of the proposed building site. At the time, Zeta Psi had enough political influence with the board of regents and President Robert Gordon Sproul to stand their ground. As a result, the building plans were rotated counterclockwise in a hurry, to face Bancroft Way to the south along an east–west axis. This is supposedly why the law building then looked so bland to visitors approaching along Bancroft Way from its west or east sides—and still looks bland on its west side today—because the "large blank walls" were originally intended to be the north and south ends of the building. To make them more attractive, it was decided to add large aluminum tablets with lengthy inscriptions, and Prosser personally selected quotations by Oliver Wendell Holmes and Benjamin Cardozo. (In 1966, the eastern side was later replaced with Simon Hall at the corner of Bancroft Way and Piedmont Avenue.)

Ironically, Zeta Psi benefited from that particular location for only five more years. The fraternity was facing the same postwar growth pressures as the rest of UC Berkeley, and agreed with the university in 1956 to trade 2251 College Avenue for a larger building on a university-owned parcel at 2728 Bancroft Way (across the street to the south). 2251 College Avenue still stands today next to the law building and is now the home of the Archaeological Research Facility.

However, in 2010, Berkeley Law archivist William Benemann cast doubt on the part of the foregoing story about how the law building had to be rotated counterclockwise at the last minute by explaining that it finds no support in the personal papers of the law building's architect, Warren Perry, which were deposited with UC Berkeley's Bancroft Library. Drawings dated as early as May 1945 show the law building in its current east–west orientation facing Bancroft Way to the south. Perry did mention in a 1953 letter that the law building "had to be crowded on a much smaller lot than was originally intended because of an immovable fraternity to the north", but never mentioned rotation. In other words, the law building was deliberately designed to avoid the preexisting fraternity house and the obvious flaws of its design cannot be blamed on a last-minute rotation. Perry had originally included large windows for the lecture halls; these were removed at the request of faculty members who thought the bay view would be too distracting.

=== Berkeley Law ===
In April 2008, the law school rebranded itself "Berkeley Law" to disentangle the confused usage which had grown over time confusing the formal name of the School of Law with the name of the building it occupied, and to more clearly align the school's name with its parent university. The administration hoped that this would improve the law school's national and international name recognition, as many individuals knew UC Berkeley had a law school but were often confused as to whether the name "Boalt Hall" referred to a separate institution. Despite the official name change, "Boalt Hall" continued to be used as the name of the law school's primary building and to refer to the law school informally for another 12 years.

By 2009, Berkeley Law was again desperately short of space, because the faculty had increased by about 25 percent over the previous four years. The law school launched a multi-year renovation and expansion project which was eventually completed in 2012. The most important improvement was to relocate and expand the law library into an underground facility under a new South Pavilion. Since the mid-1990s, the law library stacks had been crammed into conventional shelving in the law school's North Addition. Construction contractors dug a deep hole in the middle of the law school's courtyard, put the law library stacks two levels underground, and installed powered compact shelving units that move at the touch of a button. At ground level, they built a glass pavilion housing classrooms, a student lounge, and a cafe, all of which is topped off by a rooftop garden accessible by a second-floor bridge. The North Addition is now home to the Robbins Collection (a separate library of religious and civil law materials) and the visiting scholar program.

On January 30, 2020, the UC Regents completely removed the name "Boalt Hall" from Berkeley's primary law school building and in all references made to the law school. The de-naming was the outcome of a nearly three-year process launched after a UC Berkeley lecturer discovered writings by John Henry Boalt expressing flagrantly racist views. In an e-mail sent to the university at the time, UC Berkeley Chancellor Carol Christ wrote, "Boalt made profoundly offensive and racist statements about Chinese and Chinese Americans, suggesting that it would be better to 'exterminate' those of Chinese descent than to have them assimilate." The university also found that Boalt had no other historical legacy than his racism, and that naming the building after him had not been a condition of his widow's donation. This was the first time in UC Berkeley's history that the name of a building had been removed because its eponym's values did not align with those of the university. Going forward, the law school building will now be known simply as the Law Building. (UCLA and UC Irvine have always used the term "Law Building" to describe the homes of their respective law schools.)

In April 2023, the law school became one of the first to announce a formal policy on the use of artificial intelligence such as ChatGPT. Students would be allowed to use the technology for research or grammar checks but not on exams or composing assignment submissions, nor in such a way that would constitute plagiarism. However, the policy was a default, with individual professors allowed to shift from the rules if they gave prior written notice to students. Professor Chris Hoofnagle, who worked with the policy with two others, said it was an attempt to find a balance given how widespread the technology would become.

== Academics ==
=== Admissions and costs ===
The J.D. program's admissions process is highly selective, with Berkeley Law admitting 22% of all applicants who applied in 2020.

For a typical class in the J.D. program, the average age of admitted students is 25 years old, with ages ranging from 21 to 46 years old. The student-faculty ratio is nearly 6:1. Berkeley Law is unique among most law schools for having a class usually composed of 60% women and 40% men.

Berkeley Law's tuition has increased in recent years.

The total cost of attendance (adding estimated living expenses to the aforementioned tuition and fees) at Berkeley Law for the 2018–2019 academic year is $85,315 for California residents and $89,266 for non-residents. The Law School Transparency estimated debt-financed cost of attendance for three years is $282,442 for residents and $296,694 for non-residents.

For students working in public interest law who will earn less than $70,000 annually, Berkeley Law offers a ten-year loan repayment assistance program (LRAP).

Scholarships are offered on the basis of both merit and need. Named prizes include the Berkeley Law Opportunity Scholarship, which provides full tuition to first-generation college students, and the Hyundai-Kia Scholarships, which are given to students who demonstrate sustained and unique interest in law and technology. Stipends are also awarded for summer public service internships.

=== Grading ===
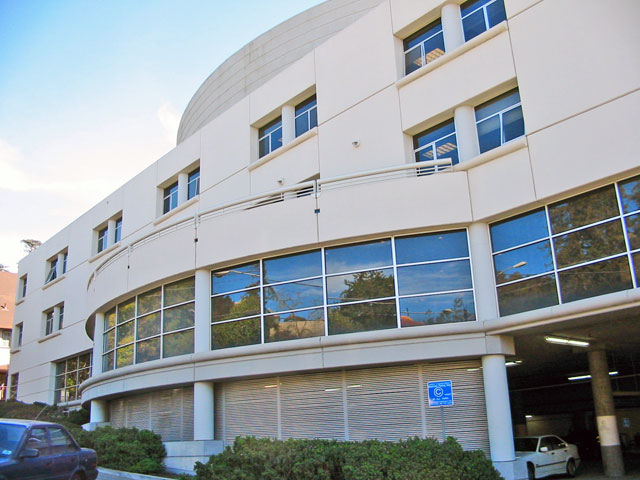
Berkeley Law's North Addition, which was constructed in 1996.

Berkeley Law's grading system for the J.D. program is unusual among most law schools but similar to the grading system used at Yale Law School, Harvard Law School, and Stanford Law School. Students are graded on a High Honors (HH), Honors (H), and Pass (P) scale. Approximately 60% of the students in each class receive a grade of Pass, 30% receive a grade of Honors, and the highest 10% receive a grade of High Honors; lower grades of Substandard Pass (or Pass Conditional, abbreviated PC) and No Credit (NC) may be awarded at the discretion of professors. The top student in each class or section receives the Jurisprudence Award, while the second-place student receives the Prosser Prize.

=== Programs ===
Berkeley Law has approximately 850 J.D. students, 200 students in the LL.M. and J.S.D. programs, and 45 students in the Ph.D. program in Jurisprudence and Social Policy.

The school also features specialized curricular programs in business, law and economics, comparative legal studies, environmental law, public interest & social justice, critical race studies, international legal studies, and law and technology.

The faculty of Berkeley Law also provide academic direction and the bulk of the instruction for the undergraduate program in Legal Studies, which is organized as a major in UC Berkeley College of Letters and Science. The Legal Studies program is not intended as a pre-law program, but rather as a liberal arts program "that can encourage sustained reflection on fundamental values."

Berkeley Law has a chapter of the Order of the Coif, a national law school honorary society founded for the purposes of encouraging legal scholarship and advancing the ethical standards of the legal profession.

The law school has been American Bar Association approved since 1923. It joined the Association of American Law Schools (AALS) in 1912.

Berkeley Law offers combined degree programs with other schools within both the UC Berkeley campus and the broader University of California system, as well as joint master's degrees with Tufts University and Harvard University.

=== Clinics ===
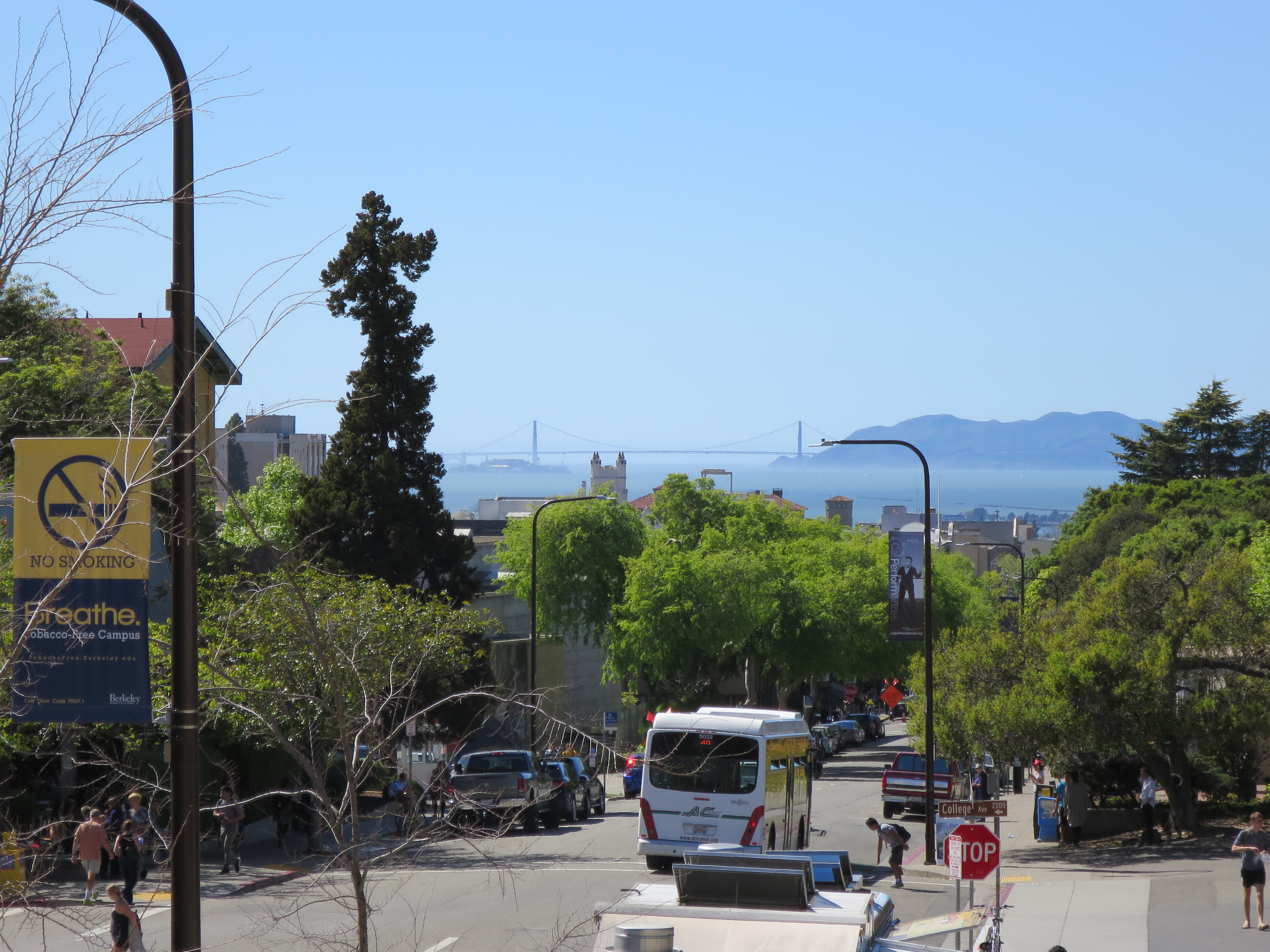
A view of the Golden Gate Bridge and the San Francisco Bay from the law school.

Berkeley Law hosts over 21 centers, six primary clinics, and a five-area domestic and international field placement program for experiential learning in specific areas of the law. These institutes are located both on the UC Berkeley campus and in other regions of the greater San Francisco Bay Area, and are often conducted through partnerships with attorneys, interest groups, law firms, and corporations throughout Northern California and the United States. In addition to these centers, students are given the ability and funding to create "SLPs," or student-initiated legal services projects.

Berkeley Law also hosts an annual James Patterson McBaine Honors Moot Court Competition, a written and oral advocacy competition on appellate law. The competition is named after the school's former A. F. and May T. Morrison Professor of Municipal Law, and it is currently sponsored by the law firm Crowell & Moring.

==== Business and Economics ====
The Berkeley Center for Law and Business was established in 2004 and is the Law School's focal point for experiential learning in corporate law. It focus on issues of corporate governance, mergers and acquisitions, financial fraud prosecution, capital markets, cybersecurity, antitrust compliance, and venture capital investments. The program also hosts the joint J.D./M.B.A. degree with Berkeley Law's adjoining Haas School of Business and national competitions for corporate negotiation.

Other centers in business law include the Robert D. Burch Center for Tax Policy and Public Finance (established in 1994) and the Law, Economics, and Politics Center.

==== Constitutional, Regulatory, and Policy ====
Constitutional and regulatory law centers at Berkeley include the new Berkeley Center for Consumer Law and Economic Justice that was founded in 2018, the Berkeley Judicial Institute, and the California Constitution Center, which is the only non-profit organization dedicated to the study of the Constitution of California. In addition to housing chapters of the American Constitution Society and The Federalist Society, the Law School enables interested students to spend a semester studying constitutional and regulatory law at the University of California's Washington campus, and hosts civil field placements and externships with the offices of various judges, United States Attorneys, Attorneys General, and other government offices.

Other policy centers at the Law School include the Center for the Study of Law and Society (established in 1961), the Kadish Center for Morality, Law and Public Affairs (established in 2000), a center dedicated to data on redistricting and voting rights, and the Institute for Legal Research.

==== Social Justice and Public Interest ====
Berkeley Law has several clinical programs and centers that allow students to gain practical experience advocating for social justice and assisting low-income or marginalized individuals. These opportunities include the Death Penalty Clinic, Policy Advocacy Clinic, Veterans Law Practicum, and Domestic Law Violence Practicum. Many clinics, externships, field placements, and programs are hosted in partnership with the nearby East Bay Community Law Center (EBCLC), which provides legal aid for disadvantaged Alameda County residents. Students can work with the EBCLC on issues such as juvenile justice, expungement of minor crimes, housing law, tax assistance, and small business establishment.

Berkeley Law also hosts multiple centers, institutes, and initiatives producing research and scholarship on issues such as criminal justice reform, access to civil justice, and more. These centers include the Thelton Henderson Center for Social Justice, Civil Justice Research Initiative, Center on Race, Sexuality & Culture, Center on Reproductive Rights and Justice, and the Public Law and Policy Program.

==== Environmental ====
The Center for Law, Energy & the Environment and the Environmental Law Clinic focus on legal solutions to climate change, sustainable power use, renewable energy, and ocean health.

==== International and Comparative ====
Berkeley Law's international law program encompasses the International Human Rights Law Clinic (established in 1998), the Human Rights Center, the Robbins Collection, and an LL.M. program. These organizations and programs develop policy solutions for human rights causes, promote global human rights and international justice through advocacy, investigate war crimes and serious violations of human rights, and sponsor comparative research and study in the fields of religious and civil law. The Human Rights Center previously won a MacArthur Award for Creative and Effective Institutions. In addition, the centers in this area train students for moot court competitions focused on international law.

Other international law centers within Berkeley Law include the Berkeley Institute for Jewish Law and Israel Studies and the Korea Law Center, as well as the Sho Sato Program in Japanese and US Law, named after co-founder Professor Sho Sato (1924–1986).

==== Technology ====
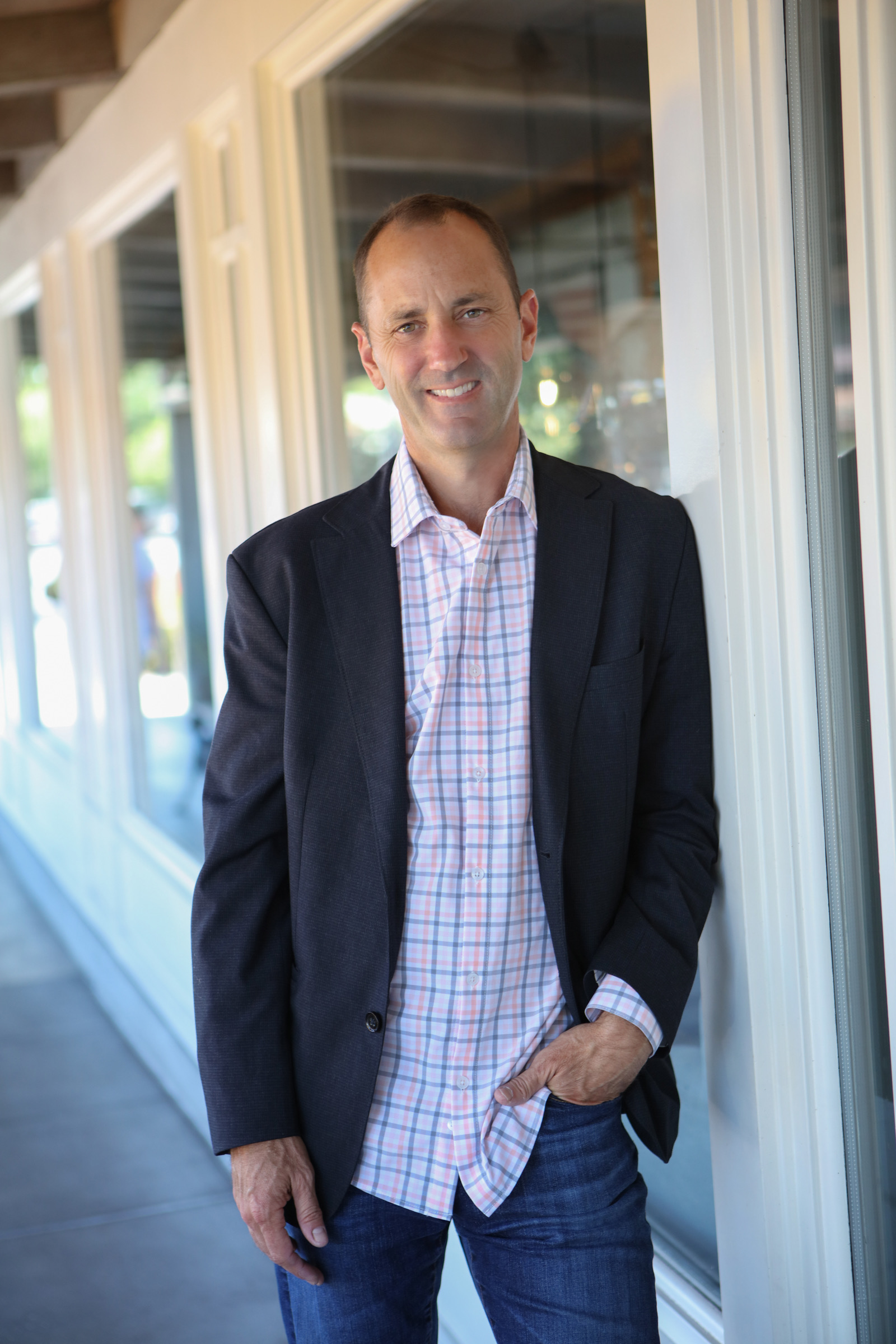
David Estrada '93, former chief legal officer at GoogleX and editor of the Berkeley Technology Law Journal

The Berkeley Center for Law and Technology was established in 1996. Issues addressed by this center and its affiliates, such as the Samuelson Law, Technology, and Public Policy Clinic (founded in 2000) and the Miller Institute for Global Challenges and the Law, include intellectual property, privacy, patents, healthcare law, and digital entertainment.

=== Publications ===
==== California Law Review ====
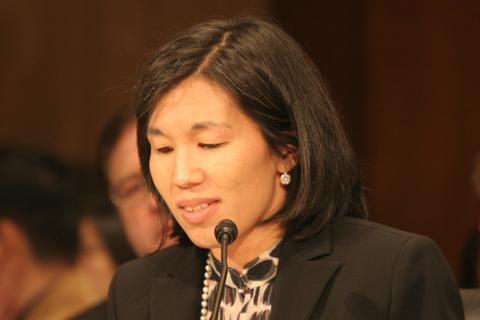
Nicole Wong '95, Deputy Chief Technology Officer of the United States (2013–2014) and co-founder of Berkeley Law's Asian American Law Journal

Established in 1912, the California Law Review is the flagship journal of Berkeley Law. The application process consists of an anonymous write-on competition, with grades playing no role in the consideration of membership. A personal statement is also considered.

==== Berkeley Journal of Criminal Law ====
Berkeley Journal of Criminal Law was first established in 2000. The journal publishes work concerning emerging issues of both substantive and procedural criminal law, as well as criminal justice issues unique to California and the Western United States. The journal publishes a fall edition in January and a spring edition in June every year and is completely digital.

==== Berkeley Journal of Employment & Labor Law ====
Berkeley Journal of Employment & Labor Law was first established in 1975 and publishes articles focusing on current developments in labor and employment law. Typical articles in the journal cover legal issues dealing with employment discrimination, "traditional" labor law, public sector employment, international and comparative labor law, employee benefits, and the evolution of the doctrine of wrongful termination. In addition to scholarly articles, the journal includes student-authored comments, book reviews and essays. It is published twice a year.

==== Berkeley Journal of International Law ====
Berkeley Journal of International Law was first established in 1982 and covers public and private international law and comparative law. It also publishes reviews of new books in the field, and is published twice yearly.

==== Berkeley Technology Law Journal ====
Berkeley Technology Law Journal began in 1986 and covers emerging issues of law in the areas of intellectual property, cyber law, information law, biotechnology, antitrust, and telecommunications law. The journal appears quarterly.

==== Ecology Law Quarterly ====
Ecology Law Quarterly began in 1971 and is Berkeley Law's journal focusing on environmental and energy law. Analysis in the journal includes short-form commentary and analysis of court decisions and policies relating to environmental law.

==== Berkeley Business Law Journal ====
Berkeley Business Law Journal was first established in 2004, and is one of the largest journals at the law school with over 100 members. It publishes an annual print journal and blog (called The Network) and connects students to professors and practitioners in the corporate law space through on-campus symposia and events.

==== Other journals ====
Other student-run legal publications include the Asian American Law Journal, Berkeley Journal of African-American Law & Policy, Berkeley Journal of Entertainment & Sports Law, Berkeley Journal of Gender, Law & Justice, Berkeley Journal of Middle Eastern & Islamic Law, and Berkeley La Raza Law Journal.

== Reception ==
=== Employment ===
In 2018, the school's bar passage rate was 90.9%.

According to Berkeley's official ABA-required disclosures, over 90 percent of 2018 graduates obtained full-time, long-term, bar admission-required employment nine months after graduation.

Employment Summary
Employment Status	Percentage
Law firm	60%
Judicial clerkship	19%
Government	2%
Public Interest	16%
Academia	1%
Business	3%
Military	1%
Class of 2018 Outcomes Ten Months after Graduation

=== Rankings ===
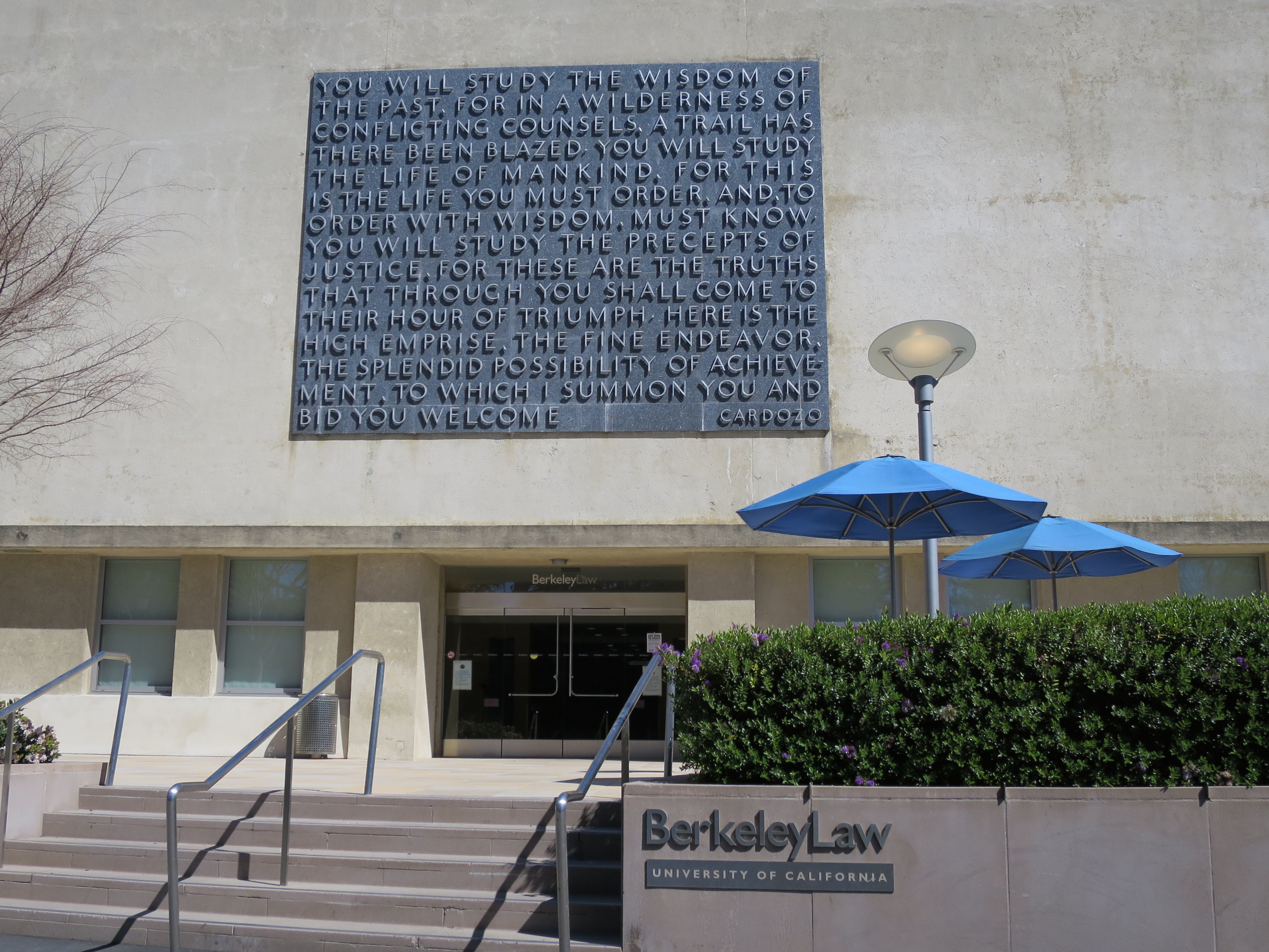
The western entrance to the law school, featuring a quotation from U.S. Supreme Court Justice Benjamin N. Cardozo in raised lettering.

In 2025, USNWR ranked Berkeley Law as the 13th best law school in the United States. In addition, USNWR ranked Berkeley Law tied for 2nd in Environmental Law, tied for 4th in Clinical Training and 22nd in Law Schools With the Most Graduates in Federal Clerkships.

In 2020, QS World Rankings ranked Berkeley Law as the seventh-best law school in the world.

Berkeley Law's flagship journal, the California Law Review, is ranked third and fifth in the United States in studies conducted by researchers at Washington & Lee University and the University of Oregon, respectively.

According to Brian Leiter's 2012 scholarly impact study, Berkeley Law ranks seventh in terms of scholarly impact as measured by the percentage of tenured faculty represented in specific specialty areas.

== People ==
=== Alumni ===
Notable Alumni of Berkeley Law

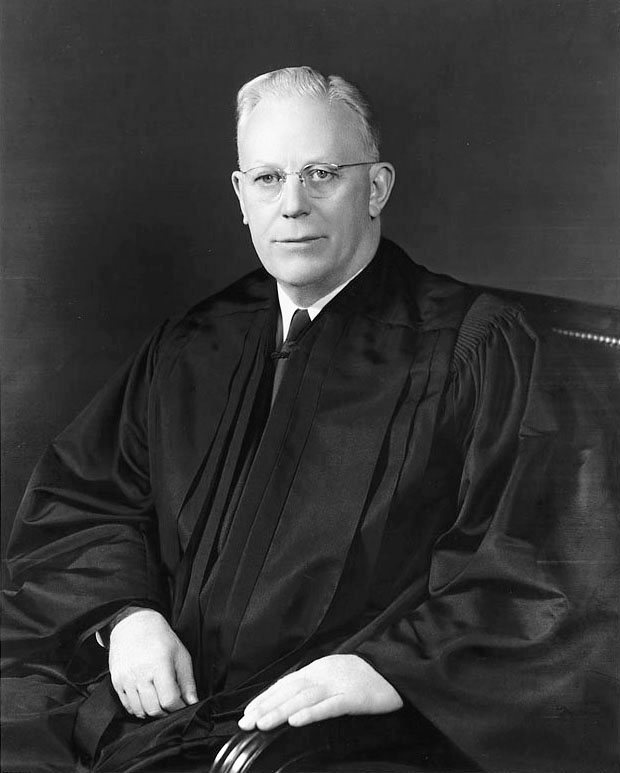
Earl Warren '14, 14th chief justice of the United States and 30th governor of California

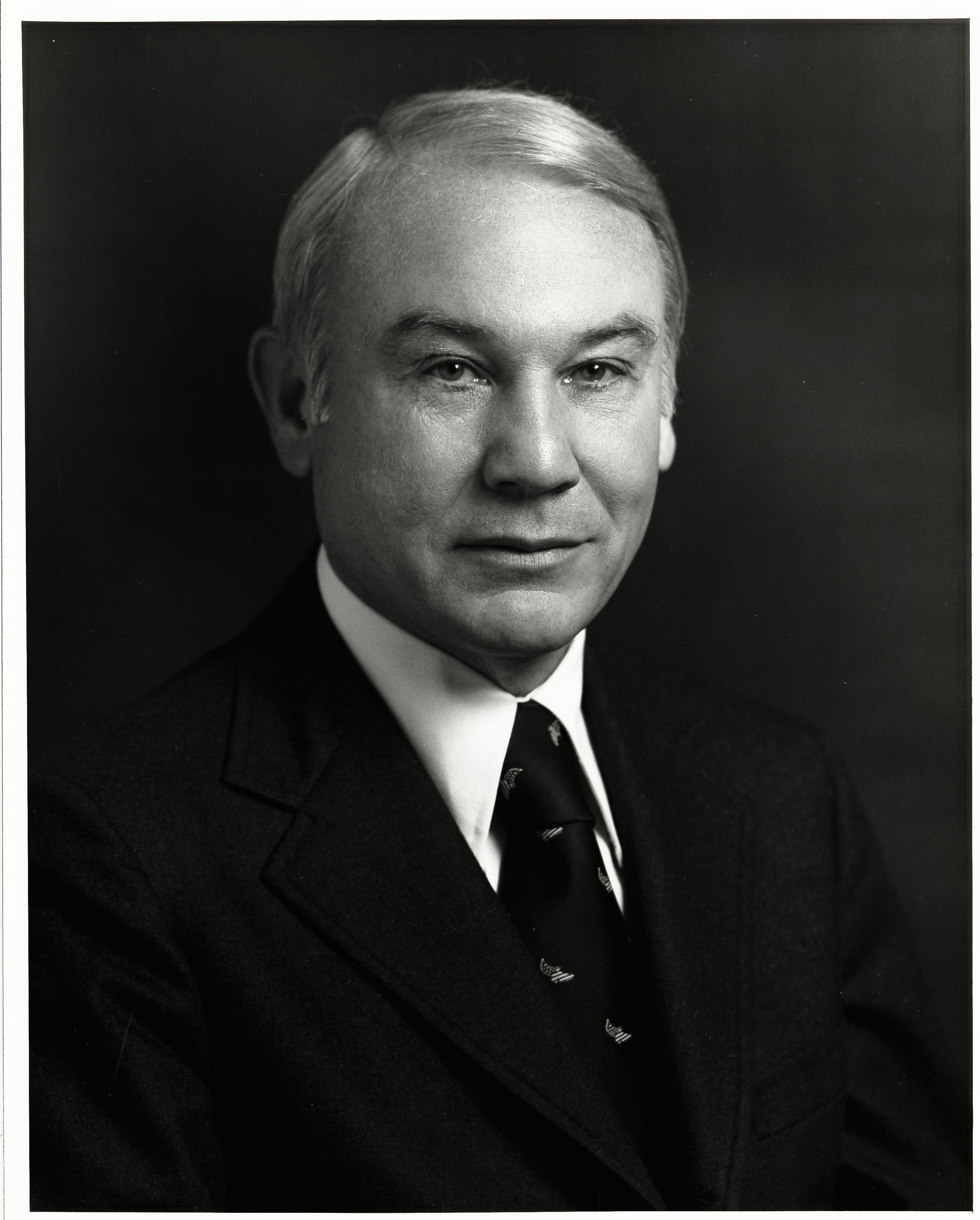
G. William Miller '52, 65th U.S. Secretary of the Treasury and 11th chair of the Federal Reserve

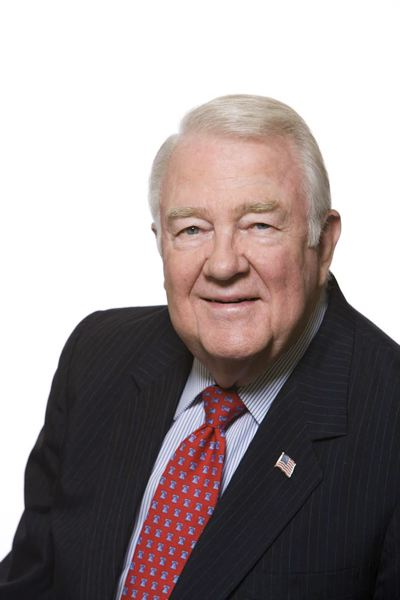
Edwin Meese '58, 75th U.S. Attorney General

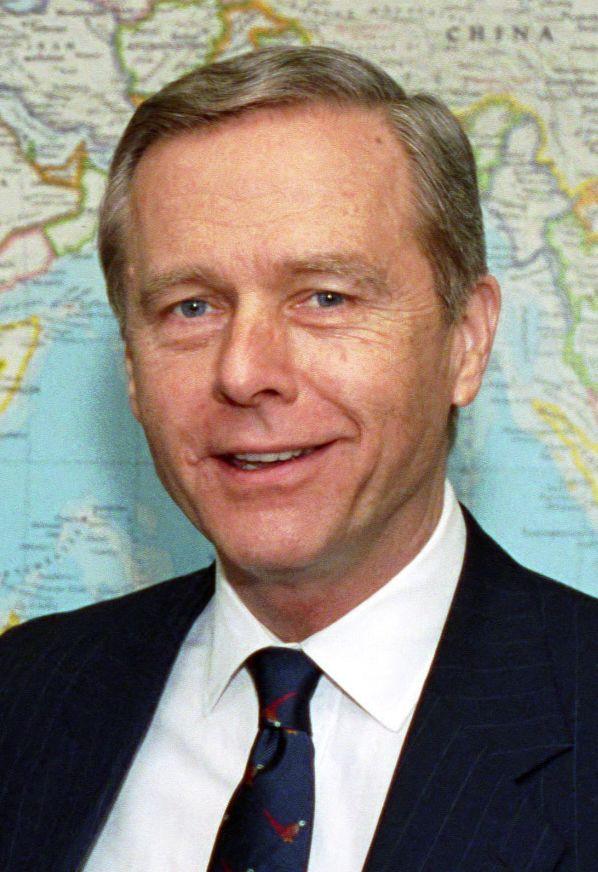
Pete Wilson '61, 36th governor of California and former United States Senator from California

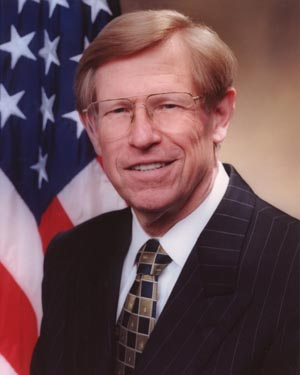
Theodore Olson '65, 42nd Solicitor General of the United States

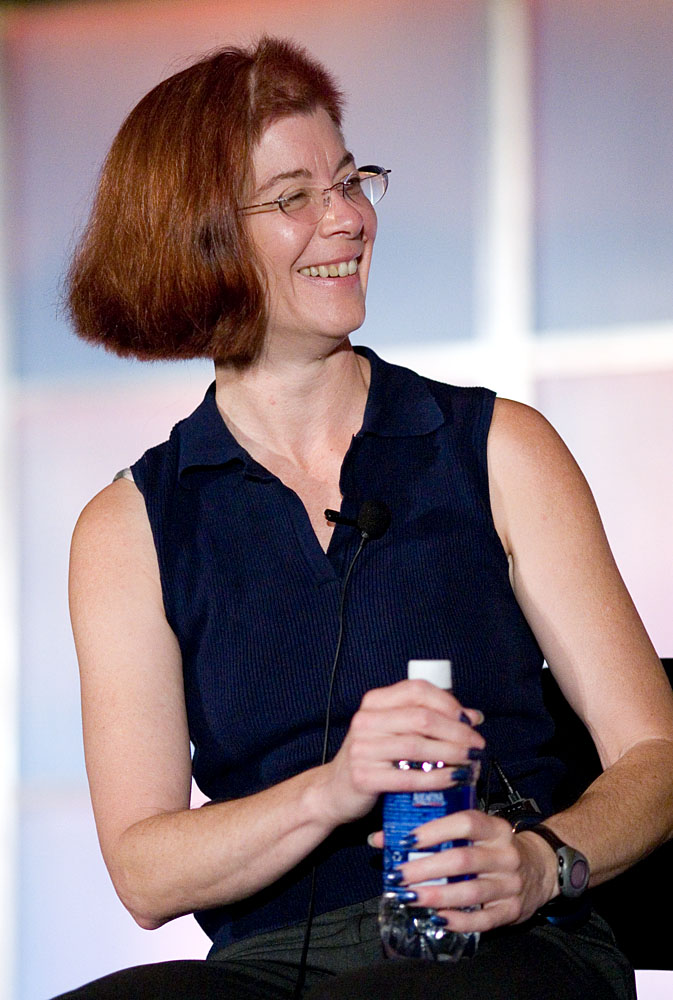
Mitchell Baker '87, CEO and Executive Chair of the Mozilla Corporation

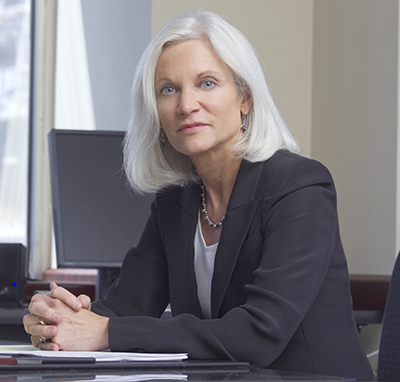
Melinda Haag '87, former U.S. Attorney for the Northern District of California

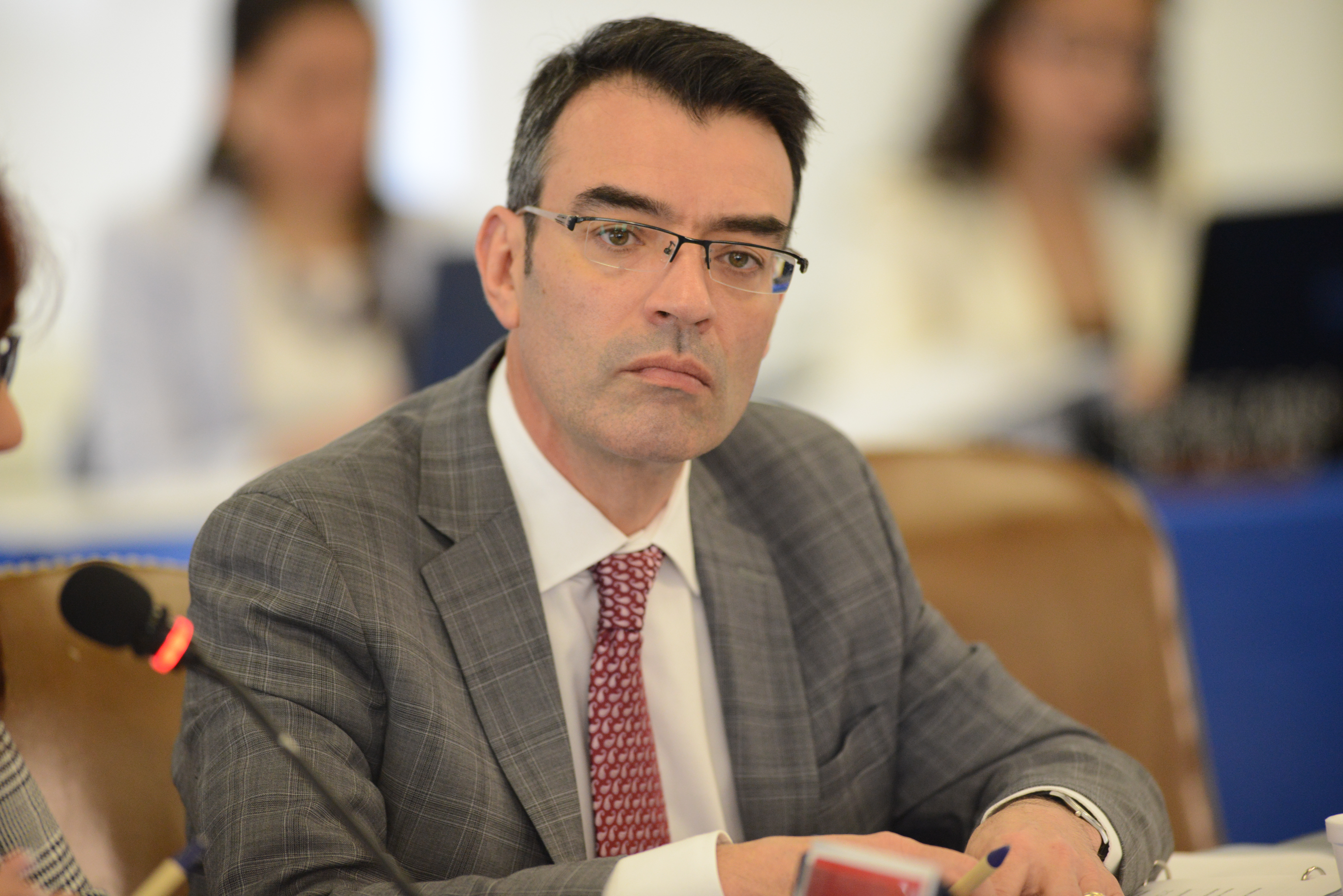
James Cavallaro '92, former president of the Inter-American Commission on Human Rights

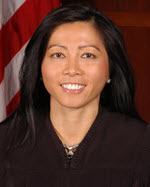
Miranda Du '94, former chief judge of the United States District Court for the District of Nevada

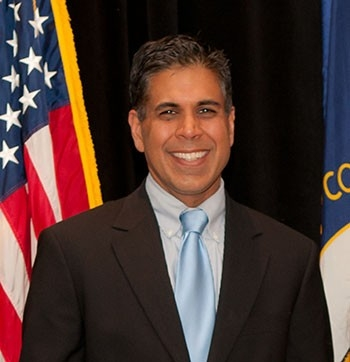
Amul Thapar '94, Judge of the United States Court of Appeals for the Sixth Circuit

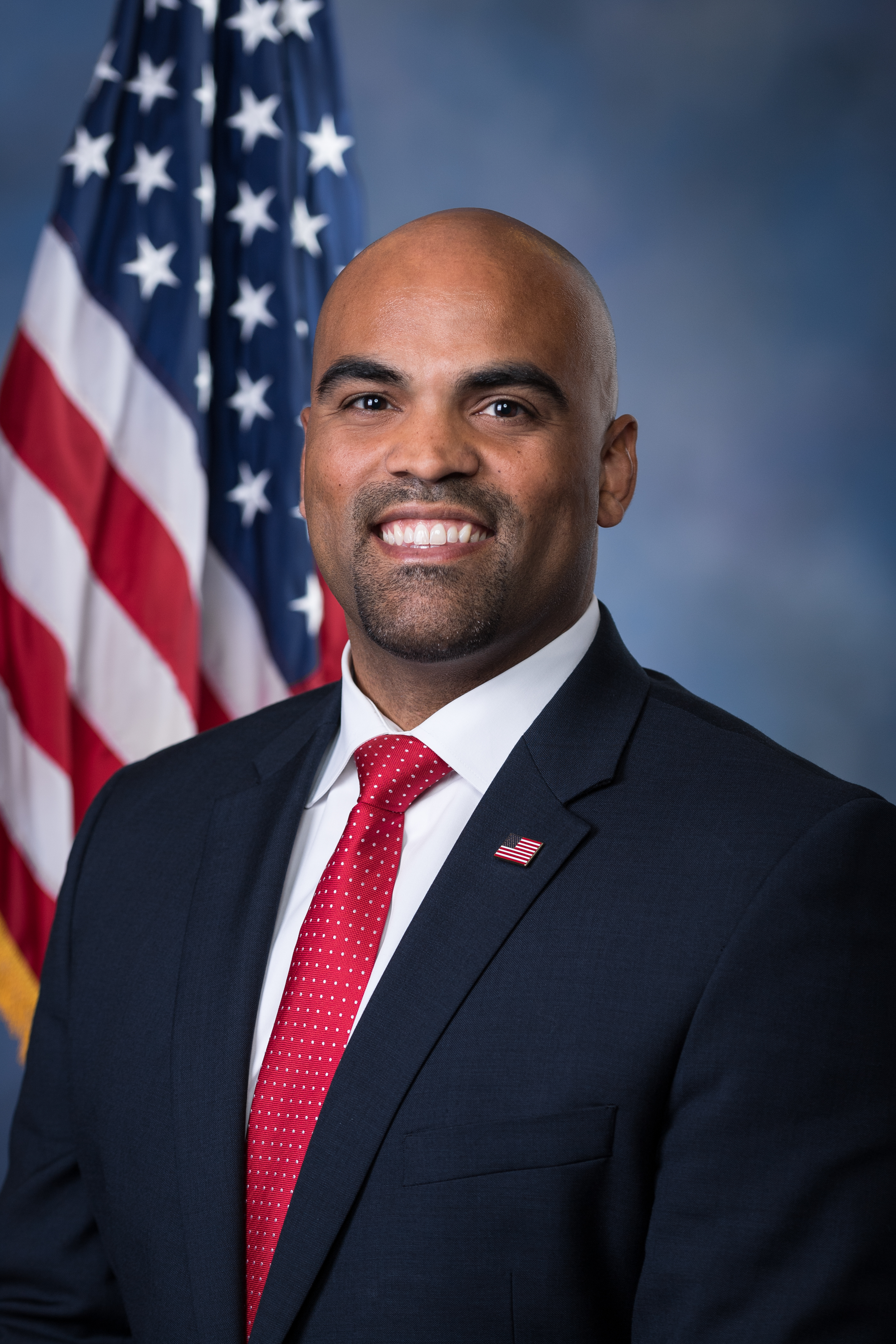
Colin Allred '14, U.S. Representative from Texas

Several state governors and United States senators, including Earl Warren and Pete Wilson of California, Neil Goldschmidt of Oregon, and Peter Welch of Vermont are graduates of Berkeley Law. The law school has also graduated a substantial number of officials who have served at the U.S. Cabinet level. Included are U.S. secretary of state Dean Rusk, who served in the Kennedy administration and Johnson administration, U.S. secretary of the treasury and chairman of the federal reserve G. William Miller, who served in the Carter administration, and U.S. attorney general Edwin Meese III, who served in the Reagan administration. Beyond these individuals, many Berkeley graduates have had the opportunity to work in the U.S. federal government in various prominent roles, including as Assistant U.S. Attorney General, Solicitor General of the United States, Assistant secretary of state, U.S. ambassador, United States Attorney, Chief Technology Officer of the United States, cabinet undersecretaries, Chair of the Federal Deposit Insurance Corporation, and members of the United States Congress. Moreover, Berkeley Law has also produced a substantial number of graduates who have served as state attorneys general, including Earl Warren, Edwin Meese III, David Frohnmayer, Paul Bardacke, David M. Louie, Jahna Lindemuth, and Sean Reyes, state cabinet officers, members of state legislatures, mayors, and city attorneys across the United States.

Berkeley Law has also produced various international leaders, including Nuremberg trials prosecutor Whitney Robson Harris and Deputy Prime Minister of Thailand Wissanu Krea-ngam.

On the judicial bench, Berkeley Law has produced a U.S. Supreme Court justice, Earl Warren, and scores of federal appellate and district judges, state supreme court justices, and international arbitrators. These graduates encompass current influential federal judges Miranda Du, Amul Thapar, Vince Chhabria, Marsha Berzon, and Evan Wallach. In international courts, alumni include High Court judge Sir Rabinder Singh, the highest-ranking judge of Asian descent in British history, and Reynato S. Puno, the former chief justice of the Philippines.

Among dozens of prominent Berkeley Law graduates in academia are international arbitrator David Caron, William and Mary Law School professor Nancy Combs, and Upendra Baxi, who has served as a dean or professor at over nine law schools in India, the United Kingdom and the United States.

And within the business, journalism and nonprofit sectors, Berkeley Law has taught students who have gone on to become CEOs and general counsels for Fortune 500 companies and other businesses, executives and founders of NGOs, and journalists. Included are Paula Boggs, Executive Vice President and General Counsel for Starbucks Corporation, Jess Bravin of The Wall Street Journal, Mitchell Baker, current CEO and Executive Chair of the Mozilla Corporation, Larry Hillblom, co-founder of DHL, and James Cavallaro, who served as President of the Inter-American Commission on Human Rights.

=== Notable faculty ===
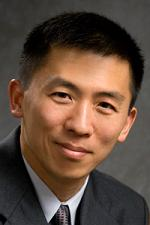
Goodwin Liu, associate justice of the California Supreme Court and Berkeley Law professor

- Stephen Barnett (1935–2009), legal scholar who opposed the Newspaper Preservation Act of 1970
- Bob Berring — law librarian
- Nick Bravin — Olympic fencer
- Erwin Chemerinsky — noted constitutional scholar, founding dean of UC Irvine School of Law, and current Dean of Berkeley Law
- Sujit Choudhry — former dean of the school of law, Cecelia Goetz Professor of Law at New York University School of Law
- Robert Cooter — scholar in law and economics
- Maria Echaveste — former deputy chief of staff to President Bill Clinton
- Christopher Edley, Jr. — dean of Berkeley Law (2004–); co-founder of The Civil Rights Project formerly at Harvard University
- Aaron Edlin — Richard W. Jennings, Class of 1939 Endowed Chair since 2005
- Melvin A. Eisenberg — author of contracts casebook and chief reporter for the Principles of Corporate Governance, issued by the American Law Institute
- William A. Fletcher — judge on the United States Court of Appeals for the Ninth Circuit
- Andrew T. Guzman — scholar of international law and international trade law
- Phillip E. Johnson — professor of law and developer of intelligent design
- Herma Hill Kay — former dean of the School of Law (1992–2000); prominent in establishing no fault divorce laws
- Hans Kelsen — jurist
- Orin Kerr — computer crime law scholar
- Goodwin Liu — constitutional law professor, associate dean, and former unsuccessful nominee to the United States Court of Appeals for the Ninth Circuit. Associate Justice, California Supreme Court (2011–present).
- John T. Noonan, Jr. — senior judge of the United States Court of Appeals for the Ninth Circuit
- Rosamond Parma — first law librarian at Berkeley, 1911–1935; also taught law bibliography
- William L. Prosser — former dean of the School of Law (1948–1961), author of several treatises and pioneer in the field of strict product liability
- Richard Rothstein— fellow at the Haas Institute, scholar of presidential segregation in the United States
- Pamela Samuelson — intellectual property law expert
- Paul M. Schwartz — information privacy law expert
- Howard Shelanski, head of the Office of Information and Regulatory Affairs
- Sarah Song — professor of law and political science
- Eleanor Swift — led the establishment of Berkeley Law's Center for Clinical Education, which brings clients in need of legal advice to Berkeley Law, where students and faculty provide counsel
- John Yoo — former deputy assistant Attorney General and author of controversial (and subsequently withdrawn) Justice Department "Torture Memos," which posited that acts regarded as torture were legally permissible.
