= Mozilla Foundation =

American nonprofit organization

- Formation: July 15, 2003; 23 years ago
- Founder: Mozilla Organization
- Type: 501(c)(3)
- Tax ID no.: 20-0097189
- Registration no.: C2543436
- Coordinates: 37°47′13″N 122°23′59″W
- Origins: Mountain View, California
- Region served: United States
- Products: Firefox; Thunderbird; Gecko; other products
- President: Mark Surman
- Executive director: Nabiha Syed
- Board of directors: Brian Behlendorf, Helen Turvey, Mitchell Baker, Alondra Nelson, Amy Keating, Nicole Wong, Edwin Macharia, Raffi Krikorian, Zain Habboo
- Subsidiaries: Mozilla Corporation; Beijing Mozilla Online Ltd; MZLA Technologies Corporation
- Revenue: $441 million (2020)
- Staff: 80 (2019)
- Volunteers: 1000+ (2019)
- Website: mozillafoundation.org

The Mozilla Foundation is an American nonprofit organization that exists to support and collectively lead the open source Mozilla project. Founded in July 2003, the organization sets the policies that govern development, operates critical infrastructure, and controls Mozilla trademarks and copyrights. It owns two taxable subsidiaries: the Mozilla Corporation, which employs many Mozilla developers and coordinates releases of the Mozilla Firefox web browser, and MZLA Technologies Corporation, which employs developers to work on the Mozilla Thunderbird email client and coordinate its releases. The Mozilla Foundation was founded by the Netscape-affiliated Mozilla Organization. The organization is currently based in the Silicon Valley city of Mountain View, California, United States.

The Mozilla Foundation describes itself as "a non-profit organization that promotes openness, innovation and participation on the Internet". The Mozilla Foundation is guided by the Mozilla Manifesto, which lists 10 principles which Mozilla believes "are critical for the Internet to continue to benefit the public good as well as commercial aspects of life".

== History ==
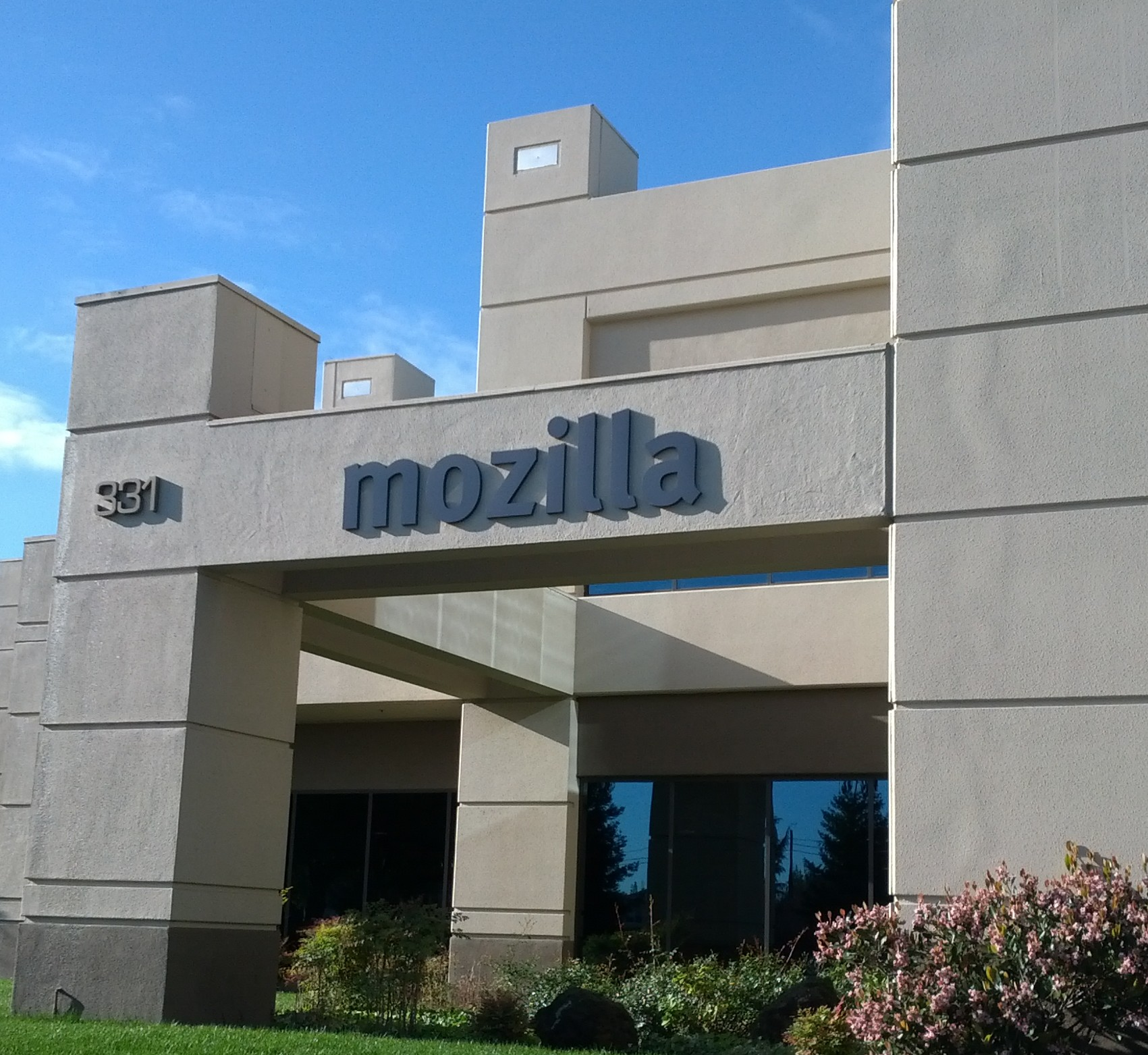
Entrance to the former Mountain View office which was home to both the Mozilla Foundation and the Mozilla Corporation until January 2021

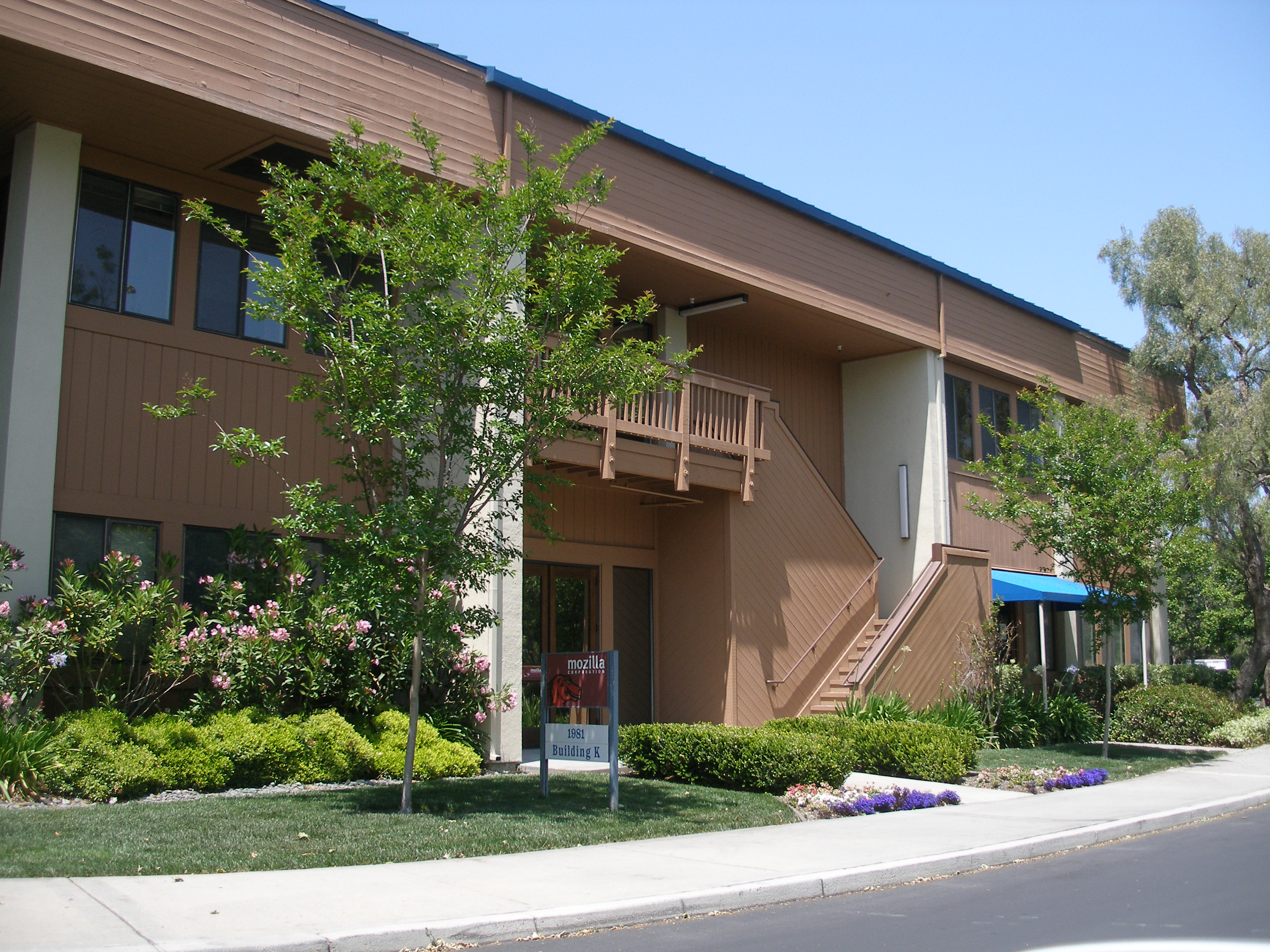
Former office next to the Googleplex shared by both the Mozilla Foundation and the Mozilla Corporation until July 2009

On February 23, 1998, Netscape created the Mozilla Organization to co-ordinate the development of the Mozilla Application Suite. When AOL (Netscape's parent) drastically scaled back its involvement with Mozilla Organization, the Mozilla Foundation was launched on July 15, 2003, to ensure Mozilla could survive without Netscape. AOL assisted in the initial creation of the Mozilla Foundation, transferring hardware and intellectual property to the organization, employed a three-person team for the first three months of its existence to help with the transition, and donated $2 million to the foundation over two years.

In September 2019, the Mozilla Foundation, Creative Commons, and Coil Technologies announced Grant for the Web, a $100 million fund designed to support the development of technologies, content, and ideas utilizing the Interledger Protocol. Management of this fund was transferred to the Interledger Foundation in 2021.

On November 4, 2024, The Mozilla Foundation announced via email they had laid off 30% of its employees as the organization says it faces a "relentless onslaught of change."

== Subsidiaries ==
=== Mozilla Corporation ===
On August 3, 2005, the Mozilla Foundation announced the creation of Mozilla Corporation, described as "a taxable subsidiary that serves the non-profit, public benefit goals of its parent, the Mozilla Foundation, and that will be responsible for product development, marketing and distribution of Mozilla products." It also handles relationships with businesses, many of which generate income. Unlike the Mozilla Foundation, the Mozilla Corporation is a tax-paying entity, giving it much greater freedom in its revenue and business activities. From 2004 to 2014, most revenue came from a deal with Google, the default search engine in the Firefox web browser. In November 2014, Mozilla signed a five-year partnership with Yahoo, making Yahoo! Search the default search engine for Firefox in the US. Yandex Search is the default for Firefox in Russia and Baidu continues its role as the default in China.

In November 2017, Mozilla terminated its agreement with Yahoo two years earlier than planned. While numerous factors were attributed to the decision to terminate the agreement, including some mention that Mozilla saw declining revenues related to the switch, likely the impetus was related to the recent acquisition of Yahoo by Verizon and Oath. Per Mozilla Chief Business and Legal Officer Denelle Dixon,

"We exercised our contractual right to terminate our agreement with Yahoo! based on a number of factors including doing what's best for our brand, our effort to provide quality web search, and the broader content experience for our users. We believe there are opportunities to work with Oath and Verizon outside of search."

=== Mozilla China ===
Beijing Mozilla Online Ltd (Chinese: 北京谋智网络技术有限公司), a.k.a. Mozilla China, was a wholly owned subsidiary of the Mozilla Corporation. Mozilla China was headquartered in Beijing.

=== Thunderbird Technologies Corporation ===
On January 28, 2020, the Mozilla Foundation announced that the Thunderbird project would henceforth be operating from a new wholly owned subsidiary, Thunderbird Technologies Corporation, in order to explore offering products and services that were not previously possible and to collect revenue through partnerships and non-charitable donations.

=== Mozilla Ventures ===
On November 2, 2022, Mozilla announced the establishment of Mozilla Ventures, an impact investing venture capital fund which "supports early-stage startups whose products or technologies advance the values in the Mozilla Manifesto." It was established with an initial US$35 million, and followed over a decade of prior investments by Mozilla into startups.

== Financing ==
The Mozilla Foundation is funded by donations and 2% of annual net revenues from the Mozilla Corporation, amounting to over US$8.3 million in 2016.

Initial funding in 2003 came from AOL, which donated US$2 million, and from Mitch Kapor who donated US$300,000. The group has tax-exempt status under section 501(c)(3) of the U.S. tax code, though the Mozilla Corporation subsidiary is taxable.

In 2006, the Mozilla Foundation received US$66.8 million in revenues, of which US$61.5 million is attributed to "search royalties" from Google.

From 2004 to 2014, the foundation had a deal with Google to make Google Search the default in the Firefox browser search bar and hence send it search referrals; a Firefox-themed Google search site was also made the default home page of Firefox. The original contract expired in November 2006. However, Google renewed the contract until November 2008 and again through 2011. On December 20, 2011, Mozilla announced that the contract was once again renewed for at least three years to November 2014, at three times the amount previously paid, or nearly US$300 million annually. Approximately 90% of Mozilla's royalties revenue for 2014 was derived from this contract.

In November 2014, Mozilla signed a five-year partnership (effective December 2014) with Yahoo!, making Yahoo! Search the default search engine for Firefox in North America. This partnership came with an annual price tag of US$375 million to be paid by Yahoo! or its acquirer in the event of an acquisition. There was also a clause stating that Mozilla reserved the right to terminate the deal early if it did not want to work with the acquirer, but the acquirer would still have to pay Mozilla the full sum per year until 2019. The default search engine in Russia will be Yandex, and in China, Baidu.

In November 2017, however, Mozilla announced that it was switching back to Google as the default search engine. This represented an early termination of its Yahoo partnership.

== People ==
Nabiha Syed was named the executive director of the Mozilla Foundation on May 15, 2024.

As of May 2025, the Mozilla Foundation board of directors has nine members:

- Nicole Wong (Chair)
- Brian Behlendorf
- Helen Turvey
- Amy Keating
- Mark Surman
- Alondra Nelson
- Edwin Macharia
- Raffi Krikorian
- Zain Habboo

== Donations ==
In 2006, after a request from Theo de Raadt of OpenBSD for funding from corporate entities that make a profit through the use of OpenSSH in their packaged distributions, the Mozilla Foundation donated $10,000 to de Raadt and OpenBSD for OpenSSH development. The funds donated came from money earned through the income provided by Google. The Mozilla Foundation found that without OpenSSH, much of the work done by developers would be through insecure and unsafe methods, and gave the funds as a thank you.

At the end of 2010, the Mozilla Foundation partnered with Knoxville Zoo in an effort to raise awareness about endangered red pandas. Two red panda (a.k.a. Firefox) cubs born at the Knoxville Zoo have officially become a part of the Mozilla community. The cubs are named Spark and Ember by online voters, and Mozilla broadcast a 24-hour live video stream of the cubs for several months.

== See also ==
- List of Mozilla products

== Bibliography ==
- "Mozilla Foundation Forms New Organization to Further the Creation of Free, Open Source Internet Software, Including the Award-Winning Mozilla Firefox Browser". Mozilla Press Center. August 3, 2005.
- "Mozilla Seeks New Leader for Its Movement-Building Arm". The Mozilla Blog.
