= Youku =

Chinese video streaming site

Youku Tudou Inc.

- Screenshot Screenshot of Youku home page
- Company type: Subsidiary
- Website type: OTT platform
- Available in: Chinese; English, Vietnamese, Thai, Indonesian, Spanish, Malay, and Portuguese (all international edition only)
- Founded: March 2006; 20 years ago
- Headquarters: Beijing, China; Shanghai, China
- Founder: Victor Koo
- Industry: Internet
- Services: Online services; Video on demand
- Revenue: US$649.5 million (2014)
- Employees: 2,104
- Parent: Alibaba Group
- Website: www.youku.com (Chinese edition) youku.tv (international edition)
- Registration: Optional (required to upload and/or comment on videos)
- Users: 448 million (as of December 2024)
- Launched: 21 December 2006; 19 years ago
- Current status: Active

Chinese name
- Simplified Chinese: 优酷
- Traditional Chinese: 優酷
- Literal meaning: excellent (and) cool
Transcriptions
Standard Mandarin
- Hanyu Pinyin: Yōukù

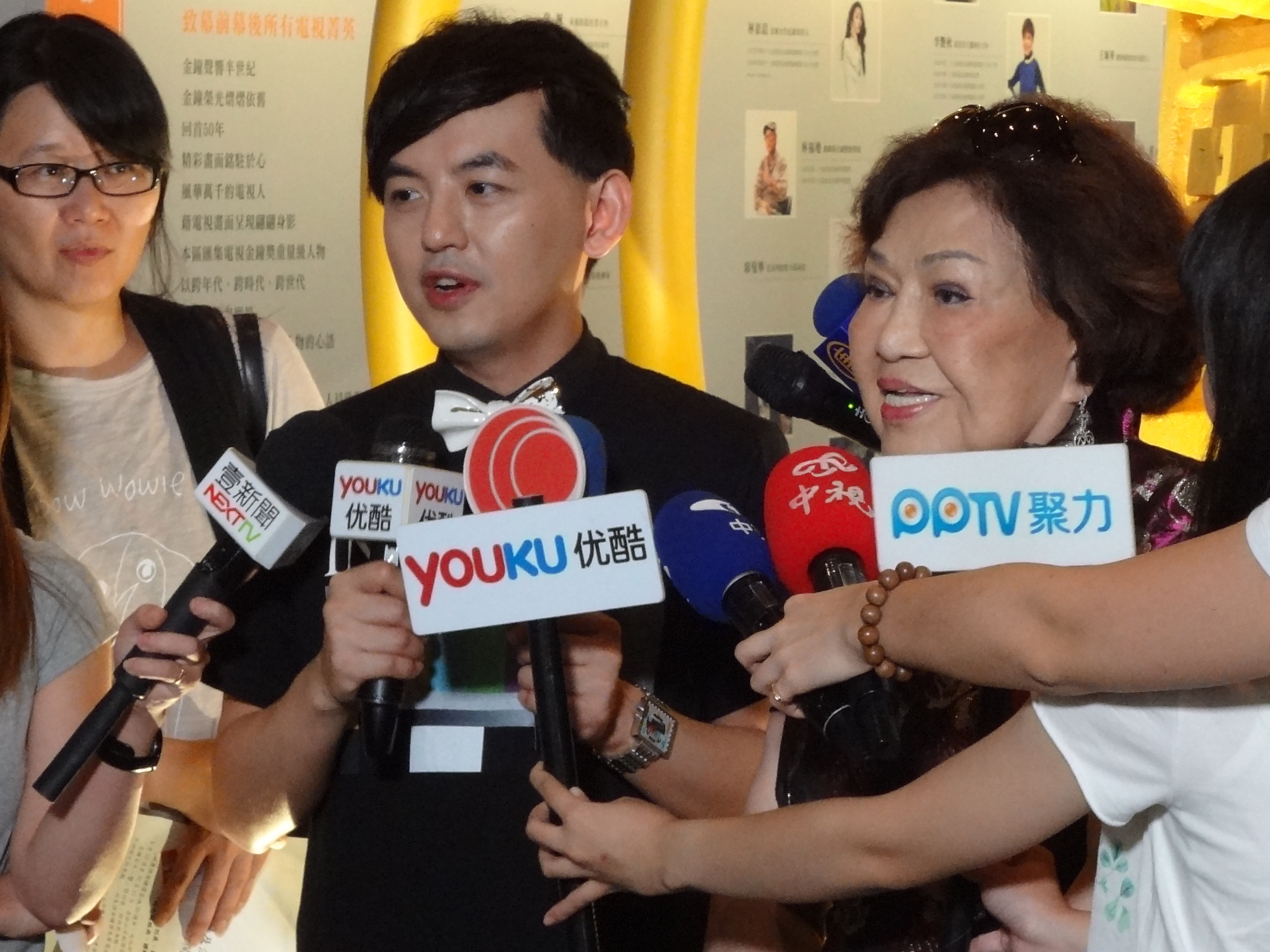
Mickey Huang and Zhou Yo at Golden Bell Awards 50th Anniversary Exhibition

Youku Tudou Inc. (formerly Youku Inc.), doing business as Youku (Chinese: 优酷; lit. 'excellent (and) cool'), is subscription video on-demand over-the-top streaming television service and former video sharing website based in Beijing, China. It operates as a subsidiary of Alibaba Group Holding Limited.

Youku has its headquarters in the Sinosteel Plaza in Haidian District, Beijing.

On 12 March 2012, Youku reached an agreement to merge with Tudou in a stock-for-stock transaction, the new entity being named Youku Tudou Inc. In 2014, it had more than 500 million monthly active users, with 800 million daily video views.

Youku is one of China's top online video and streaming service platforms, along with iQiyi, Sohu, LeTV, Tencent Video, PPTV, 56.com and Funshion. However, Youku's domination in the Chinese market was toppled by its competitor Baidu's iQiyi in 2015.

== History ==
Youku was founded by Victor Koo (Gu Yongqiang), former president of Chinese Internet portal Sohu. Initial funding for the site came from 1Verge, a fund raised by him. A beta version of the site was launched with limited geographic reach in June 2003, and the website was formally launched in December 2003. In 2007, the company received $25 million in funding from venture capitalists. In December 2009, the company announced that it had raised a total of $110 million in private equity funding. Major investors include Brookside (Bain) Capital, Sutter Hill Ventures, Maverick Capital, and Chengwei Ventures.

The company initially emphasized user-generated content but has since shifted its focus to professionally produced videos licensed from over 1,500 content partners.

As of January 2010, Youku.com was ranked #1 in the Chinese Internet video sector according to Internet metrics provider CR-Nielsen (keeping in mind that YouTube is banned in China). In 2008, Youku partnered with Myspace in China. Later that year, Youku became the sole online video provider embedded in the China Edition of Mozilla Firefox.

In January 2010, Youku and competitor Tudou announced the creation of a video broadcasting exchange network, under which Youku and Tudou will cross-license professionally produced video content.

Youku recorded gross revenues of 200 million RMB in 2009.

On 8 December 2010, Youku was listed at the New York Stock Exchange for its first time. The stock closed at $33.44 on its first day of trading giving the company a market capitalization of approximately $3.3 billion. For the first 9 months of 2010 Youku reported revenue of $35.1 million and recorded a loss of $25 million during this period. YouKu.com seems to have no relation to the Chinese domain youku.cn.

Victor Koo was once an employee of Bain & Company, one of the most prominent management consulting firms in the world.

In December 2018, the company announced a layoff of the president of the unit Yang Weidong due to his assistance to the police in investigation about the case of seeking economic benefits.

The mobile app of Youku was banned in India (along with other Chinese apps) on 2 September 2020 by the government, the move came amid the 2020 China-India skirmish.

According to Quest Mobile, Youku had 374 million monthly active users in December 2017, increasing to 448 million by December 2024.

In its financial report for the quarter ending December 2023, Alibaba reported a $1.2 billion loss from Youku's operations, which was written off in support of the streaming service. By 2026 the results showed that Youku as a unit had improved materially from 2023's write-ff period. In 2025, Alibaba had indicated that Digital Media and Entertainment revenue rose 12% year over year, and the segment's adjusted EBITA turned positive in the March 2025 quarter, driven by Youku's profitability. In the first nine months of 2025, Youku Holdings reported online marketing solution billings of RMB 11.863 billion, up 35.3% over last year. Alibaba's FY2025 annual materials still list Youku as part of its Digital Media and Entertainment portfolio. Youku’s advertising revenue and content efficiency improved, narrowing losses overall. Alibaba continued to include Youku in its Digital Media and Entertainment portfolio during 2025 but in 2026 it changed its reporting structure. Even though Youku remains part of Alibaba through the Hujing Digital Media and Entertainment Group but the group is now reported with the border 'All Others' category rather than separately as a presented segment.

=== Merger ===
On 12 March 2012, Youku and Tudou two of the biggest online video companies in China announced plans to merge, creating one of China's biggest video sites. Prior to the announcement of the merger, Youku was the #11 website in China, and Tudou was #14. The company's name was changed to Youku Tudou Inc. The chairman of the board is Victor Koo, the founder of Youku. The company had a stock listed on the NYSE, YOKU before being acquired by Alibaba Group on 6 November 2015. In December 2016 it reported it had 30 million subscribers. It was expected that the integration of subscription data from Youku-Tudou with Alibaba's buyer profiles would help the e-commerce company construct more specific customer profiles and enable better targeted advertising.

=== Shift to professional content ===
At the time of the company's IPO in 2010, the company already had a large library of professionally produced, licensed content due to the lack of appeal of user-generated content within China at the time. This could be seen in the success of IQiyi launched in 2010 in China, which caused Youku issues around 2015 which prompted a buyout by Alibaba. In 2015, Alibaba bought the YouTube-like service in an all-cash deal and had previously spent $1.22 billion on an 18.3 percent stake in the company. The deal valued Youku at around $5.1 billion, so the total offering was around $3.5 billion. Alibaba intended to take full ownership of the company. Due to this, the company shifted away from user-generated content gradually and since at least 2019, the company only serves professionally produced content similarly to Hulu. However since 2019, China has seen a large explosion of user-generated video in BiliBili and Douyin.

== See also ==
- 56.com
- iQiyi
