= Yang Weidong =

Chinese entrepreneur (born 1974)

- 杨伟东
- Born: 1974 (age 51–52); China
- Education: Hohai University
- Occupation: Entrepreneur
- Years active: 2009–present
- Agents: AliMusic Youku Tudou; Alibaba Cultural Entertainment Group

Yang Weidong (Chinese: 杨伟东; born 1974) is a Chinese entrepreneur who was CEO of Youku Tudou from 2016 to 2018 and CEO of AliMusic from May 2018 to December 2018.

== Biography ==
Born in 1974, Yang graduated from Hohai University. He joined Nokia Corporation in 2009, and several years later promoted to the Marketing Director position. In June 2012 he joined the MaxTimes and worked there until February 2013. In March 2013, he was recruited by Gu Yongqiang as vice-president and then president of Tudou, where he was promoted to CEO of Youku Tudou in November 2015. In October 2016, Alibaba Cultural Entertainment Group was set up, Yang was appointed CEO of Great Youku Business Group. In May 2018, he concurrently was CEO of AliMusic. In December 2018, he was being investigated by the police because of economic problems. He was replaced by Fan Luyuan (Chinese: 樊路远).
