= James Cavallaro =

American legal scholar

James Louis Cavallaro
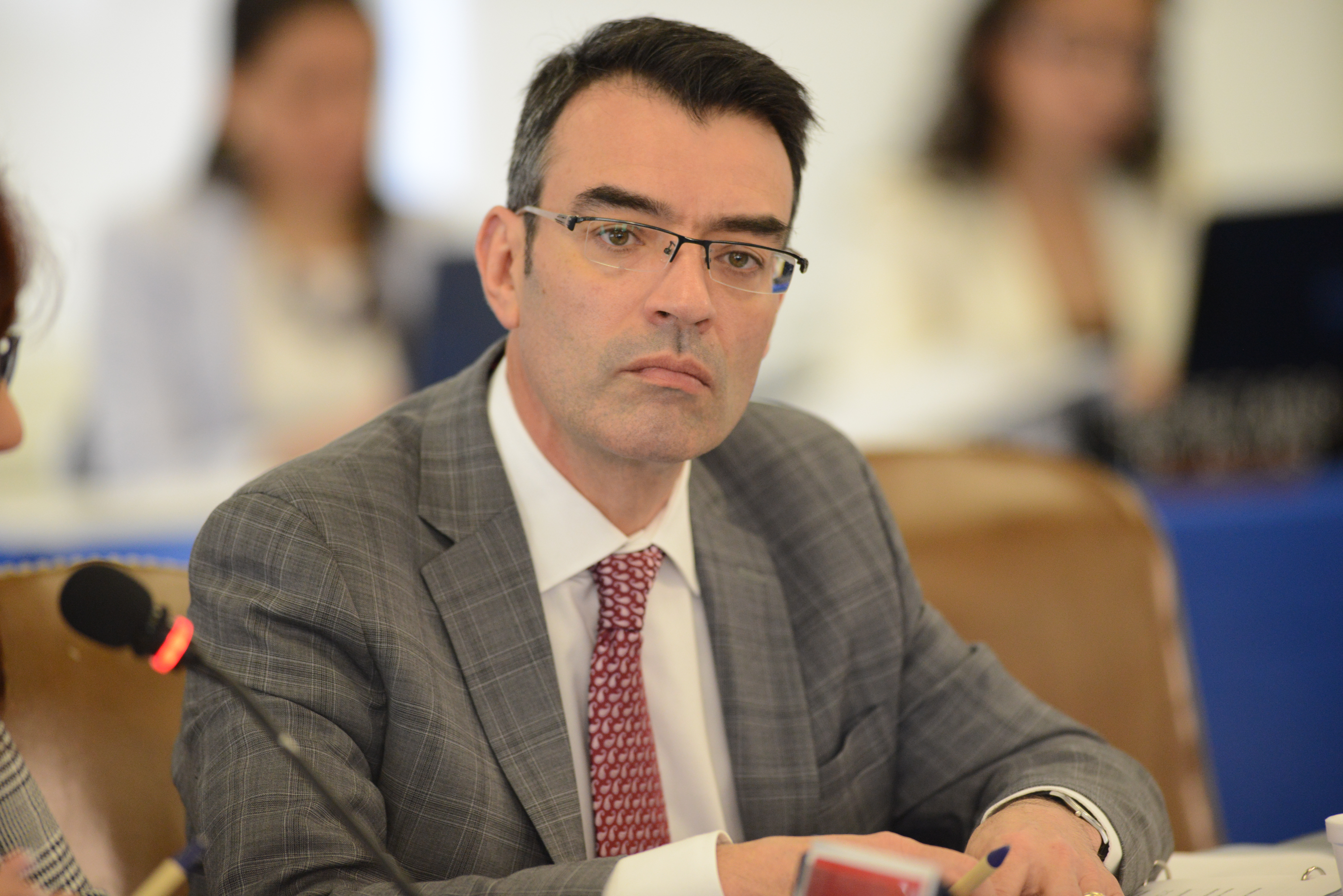
- Born: James Louis Cavallaro
- Other name: Jim Cavallaro
- Occupations: Law professor; Human rights lawyer; Academic
- Known for: President of the Inter-American Commission on Human Rights (2016–2017); Co-founder and Executive Director of the University Network for Human Rights
- Awards: Order of the Coif

Academic background
- Education: Harvard University (BA); UC Berkeley School of Law (JD); Pablo de Olavide University (PhD)

Academic work
- Discipline: Human rights law
- Sub-discipline: Latin American human rights; International law; Conflict resolution; Transitional justice
- Institutions: NOVA University of Lisbon; Wesleyan University; Yale Law School; UCLA School of Law; Columbia Law School; UC Berkeley School of Law; Stanford Law School (2011–2018); Harvard Law School (2002–2011)

James (Jim) Louis Cavallaro is a professor of law and the co-founder and executive director of the University Network for Human Rights. He currently teaches human rights in the School of Law at NOVA University of Lisbon, Portugal. He is the director of the LL.M. in Human Rights Advocacy and the Advocacy & Community-based Training Semester (ACTS) programs. In addition to NOVA, Cavallaro frequently teaches at Yale Law School, and the University of California at Los Angeles (UCLA). He also teaches at Columbia Law School and the University of California Berkeley. Cavallaro previously taught at Wesleyan University, where he founded and led the Minor in Human Rights Advocacy, as well as the Wesleyan ACTS for Human Rights program. Prior to launching the University Network, Cavallaro founded the International Human Rights and Conflict Resolution Clinic at the Mills Legal Clinic at Stanford Law School, United States. In 2018, Cavallaro and Ruhan Nagra founded the University Network for Human Rights, an organization that engages students and their universities in human rights work in the United States and around the world. Cavallaro served as a commissioner (2014-2017) and President (2016-2017) of the Inter-American Commission on Human Rights.

== Education ==
Cavallaro received his BA from Harvard University and his JD from University of California at Berkeley School of Law, where he served on the California Law Review and graduated with Order of the Coif honors. He also holds a doctorate in human rights and development from Pablo de Olavide University, Seville, Spain.

== Career in practice ==
Early in his career, Cavallaro spent several years working with Central American refugees on the U.S.-Mexican border and with human rights groups in Chile challenging abuses by the Pinochet government. In 1994, he opened a joint office for Human Rights Watch and the Center for Justice and International Law (CEJIL) in Rio de Janeiro and served as Director of the office, overseeing research, reporting and litigation against Brazil before the Inter-American system's human rights bodies. In 1999, he founded the Global Justice Center, which is now a leading Brazilian human rights nongovernmental organization.

Cavallaro served as Commissioner (2014-2017) and President (2016-2017) of the Inter-American Commission on Human Rights. During his tenure, Cavallaro led the commission through its most severe financial crisis in recent history and oversaw the creation of the first-ever expert group convened to address forced disappearances in Mexico (in particular, with a mandate to investigate the disappearance of 43 students from the Ayotzinapa teachers college). Expert groups have since become an important mechanism of the Commission to respond to human rights crises. As the body’s Rapporteur on the Rights of Persons Deprived of Liberty, Cavallaro visited and documented conditions in scores of detention centers in the Americas, urging States to reduce mass incarceration, particularly of those facing trial and individuals in situations of vulnerability.

Cavallaro authored or co-authored a number of reports on rights in Latin America, including: "Frontier Injustice: Human Rights Abuses Along the U.S. Border with Mexico Persist Amid Climate of Impunity",Police Brutality in Urban Brazil; Extrajudicial, Summary or Arbitrary Executions: An Approximation of the Situation in Brazil; Behind Bars in Brazil.

=== The University Network for Human Rights ===
The University Network for Human Rights (UNHR) is an American nonprofit human rights organization co-founded in 2018 by James Cavallaro and Ruhan Nagra. Combining human rights investigations with practical education, the organization trains university students in fact-finding, interviewing, evidence analysis, and advocacy, emphasizing collaboration with communities affected by human rights abuses. UNHR established an academic partnership with Wesleyan University, where its human rights advocacy program began as a pilot in 2019 and became an undergraduate minor in 2022, before expanding its educational activities through a 2023 agreement with Portugal's NOVA School of Law to develop a postgraduate program in human rights advocacy. Its investigations and advocacy have addressed environmental injustice in Louisiana, state repression and violence in Bolivia, and human rights abuses, including the treatment of prisoners of war and displaced civilians. Its research has received external recognition, with Bolivia's Defensoría del Pueblo citing a joint investigation by UNHR and Harvard Law School in its official assessment of human rights violations, while UCLA's Promise Institute for Human Rights praised a collaborative investigation involving UNHR for having correctly warned of the impending ethnic cleansing in 2023.

== Academia and teaching ==
Cavallaro joined Harvard Law School in 2002. In 2004, he was appointed clinical director of the Human Rights Program, and then went on to serve as the executive director of the program from 2007 to 2011. In 2011, Cavallaro joined the faculty of Stanford Law School and was appointed Director of the International Human Rights and Conflict Resolution Clinic at the Mills Legal clinic.

== Publications and research interests ==
Cavallaro is the author of scores of books, reports, and articles on human rights issues. Among his recent scholarly works are: Active Impunity in Mexico: How to Understand and Confront Massive Human Rights Violations ("La impunidad activa en México: Cómo entender y enfrentar las violaciones masivas a los derechos humanos") (2021). Doctrine, Practice, and Advocacy in the Inter-American Human Rights System (forthcoming November 2018).Reevaluating Regional Human Rights Litigation in the Twenty-First Century: the Case of the Inter-American Court (2008); "Looking Backward to Address the Future?: Transitional Justice, Rising Crime and Nation-Building" (2008); and "Never Again?:The Legacy of the Argentine and Chilean Dictatorships for the Global Human Rights Regime" (2008). Cavallaro has written or overseen a number of policy studies and advocacy texts on human rights, including: "Breach of Faith: Persecution of the Ahmadiyya Community in Bangladesh", (Human Rights Watch Short Report, Brad Adams & James L. Cavallaro eds., 2005); "Keeping the Peace in Haiti?: An Assessment of the United Nations Stabilization Mission in Haiti Using Compliance with its Prescribed Mandate as a Barometer for Success", HLS Advocates for Human Rights/Global Justice Center James L. Cavallaro ed., 2005; Crime, Public Order, and Human Rights (International Council on Human Rights Policy, 2003). Cavallaro has also published widely in Spanish and Portuguese. Cavallaro's work focuses primarily on human rights issues in Latin America, Inter-American human rights systems, international human rights law and practice, and the human rights movement. Cavallaro has published opinion pieces on the CIA role in torture, drone strikes, on the global refugee crisis, and Inter-American Commission, among other issues of social justice and human rights.

== Inter-American Commission on Human Rights Nomination ==
On February 14, 2023, the Biden administration withdrew Cavallaro's nomination to the Inter-American Commission on Human Rights, citing his criticism of Israel as an apartheid state and Tweets Cavallaro made characterizing House Minority Leader Hakeem Jeffries as “Bought. Purchased. Controlled,” by pro-Israel lobbying groups like AIPAC and Pro-Israel America, the largest single donor to Jeffries's campaign. Pro-Israel groups donated nearly half a million dollars to Jeffries's 2022 campaign, second only to donations from the financial industry.
