= John Henry Boalt =

American lawyer (1837–1901)

- Born: March 29, 1837; Norwalk
- Died: May 9, 1901 (aged 64)
- Alma mater: Heidelberg University
- Occupation: Lawyer

John Henry Boalt (March 29, 1837 – May 9, 1901) was an attorney who resided in Oakland, California, in the late 19th century.

== Education ==
After graduating from Amherst College in 1857, Boalt attended the University of Heidelberg School of Mining.

== Career ==
He left Germany to enlist in the Union Army and was commissioned as a lieutenant in the Eleventh Ohio Cavalry as a member of the Signal Corps in the American Civil War. He served throughout the rest of the War. After the War, he moved west to Nevada with his wife Elizabeth Josselyn Boalt in 1867 and worked in mining, but soon entered the legal profession. He became a judge in Nevada in 1870 before moving to Oakland in 1871, where he started the San Francisco law firm of Estee & Boalt where he was a partner until 1884. In 1889, he became a member of the leading west coast law firm Garber, Boalt & Bishop handling cases involving mining law and operations, including one where he acted for the City of San Francisco, and was president of the local Bar association, Library Trustee of the city of Oakland, and member of the Bohemian Club. He retired in 1892.

== Personal life ==
Boalt married Elizabeth Josselyn (born Hanover, Massachusetts, 30 June 1838) on 31 July 1866, in Waverley, Massachusetts, and together they had one child, Alice Boalt Tevis, first wife of Hugh Tevis. She died unexpectedly; her death was "a blow from which Judge Boalt never recovered". At his death due to heart failure, his only surviving relatives were his wife and granddaughter, Alice, who later died at age 10. After Boalt's death in 1901, his widow, Elizabeth Josselyn Boalt, created a trust allocating two parcels of land in San Francisco valued at $100,000 to be sold for the benefit of the University of California to construct a building to house its new School of Jurisprudence on the Berkeley campus. Six weeks later, the 1906 earthquake destroyed the properties. The trustees were able to sell only one parcel, for far less than the original value. In recognition of the gift, the new building was named Boalt Memorial Hall of Law. In 1906, she created a further trust, whereby, subject to a life estate and certain powers of revocation, she transferred substantially all of her remaining estate "to establish and endow a professorship in the Department of Jurisprudence in the University of California, to be known as the 'John H. Boalt Professorship of Jurisprudence.'" She later modified the fund as a permanent endowment "for such chair or chairs as my said trustees or their successors, may designate and determine, or, in lieu of such designation, as the said Board of Regents shall determine." She was also a secret patron of artists, musicians, and writers.

A pianist in her youth, Elizabeth Josselyn Boalt went on to enroll in Vienna as a pupil of Leschetizky at age 60. She studied Italian, German, and French and maintained a society of artists, musicians, and literary people.

== Legacy ==
Boalt has recently become known for his views of Chinese immigration in California in his time. He was an influential supporter of the Chinese Exclusion Act in 1882. In 1877 he read a paper before the Berkeley Club in which he wrote that certain Chinese in San Francisco were liars, some hired murderers, and distinct American/Chinese distinct appearances provoked "unconquerable repulsion." Therefore they were unassimilable. This writing was later championed by Senator Creed Haymond of Sacramento, who was the chair of the newly convened Senate Special Committee on Chinese Immigration and California Senator Aaron A. Sargent.

Because of Boalt's perceived racist legacy, Berkeley law lecturer Charles P. Reichmann proposed in 2018 that the building be renamed. The school announced its decision to remove his name from the building in January 2020, and was removed from the building on the morning of January 30, 2020.
