= Interoperable Instant Payment System =

Bangladeshi instant payment system

Interoperable Instant Payment System (IIPS)
- Product type: Instant payment
- Current owner: Bangladesh Bank
- Country: Bangladesh
- Introduced: TBA
- Markets: Bangladesh

The Interoperable Instant Payment System (IIPS) is a Bangladeshi instant payment platform being developed by Bangladesh Bank, the central bank of Bangladesh. This initiative, based on the open-source Mojaloop platform, aims to create a unified network connecting all banks, Mobile Financial Services (MFS) providers, microfinance institutions, and digital banks.

== Background ==
By the 2020s, Bangladesh had a rapidly growing digital finance landscape, but its payment systems have historically operated in silos. Mobile Financial Services like bKash and Nagad have seen widespread adoption, but interoperability between them and traditional bank accounts has been limited. To address this fragmentation and accelerate the country's transition toward a cashless economy, Bangladesh Bank announced the development of the new IIPS in September 2025.

== Development ==
The project is supported by the Bill & Melinda Gates Foundation, a major proponent of Mojaloop, an open-source payment platform designed for low-cost, instant transactions in emerging markets. This approach grants Bangladesh Bank local ownership of the platform, reducing dependence on expensive, proprietary foreign technology and ensuring local adaptation. The central bank also engaged local firms through the Mojaloop Accelerator Program to build capacity and demonstrate working implementations.

== See also ==
- United Payment Interface
- Bkash
- Nagad
