= Mojaloop =

Financial software project

- Original author: Bill & Melinda Gates Foundation
- Developer: Mojaloop Foundation
- Initial release: 2017
- Repository: https://github.com/mojaloop/
- Written in: JavaScript, TypeScript
- Engine: Node.js
- License: Apache License
- Website: https://mojaloop.io/

Mojaloop is an open-source software project of the Mojaloop Foundation. The project is a reference model for creating interoperable payments platforms for digital financial providers intended to reduce the technical barrier of financial inclusion efforts. It was created and released by the Bill & Melinda Gates Foundation’s Level One Project in 2017. Moja is a Swahili word meaning "one".

Mojaloop is a collection of Node.js microservices. There are multiple components for routing, clearing, and settling payments between digital financial service providers. It uses the Interledger Protocol for facilitating payments.

== History ==
The earliest mention of Mojaloop by commercial entities was the announcement in 2018 by Orange Telecom Group and MTN to establish a new joint venture called Mowali which would implement the Mojaloop technology. The joint venture was closed down in November 2022 due to lack of required approvals by the Central Bank.

In 2019, Forbes covered the efforts to build a solution in Tanzania.

The Mojaloop project was cited part of the Tanzania Instant Payment System (TIPS) which went began testing in June 2021 and was continuing with a close group test in early 2023. The Central Bank of Tanzania mentions TIPS in 2020.

In June 2022, Mojaloop announced the creation of the Central Bank Digital Currency (CBDC) Center of Excellence in Singapore.

Mojaloop implements payments in a flow including verification and lookup of destination account, quote, payments push and done via RESTful APis. Design documents provide documentation to implementing entities.

The Mojaloop Foundation is a US based charity, headquartered in Massachusetts, with expenses of $2.2 million in 2020.

Grants from Bill and Melinda Gates Foundation to Mojaloop include $4.7M in 2020 and $8.5M in 2023.

In 2024, Higala leverages on Mojaloop to lower the on-ramp barrier for small banks and other financial institutions to participate in interoperable payment rails and reduce the cost of moving funds amongst financial institutions in Philippines.

In 2025, initiative to launch interoperable payment system in Bangladesh with support from Gates foundation was announced.

== General and cited references ==
- Morris, David Z. (6 May 2020). "Google and Gates Foundation join forces to promote digital payments in the developing world". Fortune.
- Galeon, Dom (20 October 2017). "The Gates Foundation just launched a blockchain-powered mobile payment system". Futurism.
- "Digital payments in developing countries set for major boost". New Vision. 15 May 2020.
- "Software to fix financial interoperability". New Vision. 14 October 2019.
