= Nicole Wong =

Public policy lawyer

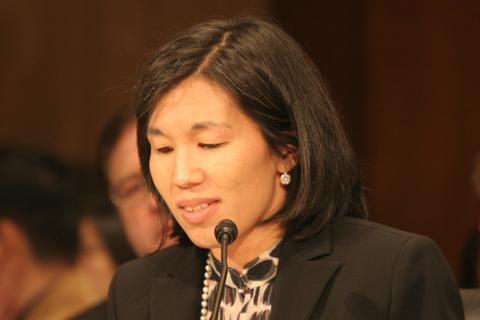
- Wong in 2010

Deputy Chief Technology Officer of the United States
- In office May 2013 – August 16, 2014
- President: Barack Obama

Personal details
- Born: Nicole A. Wong
- Education: Georgetown University (BA); University of California, Berkeley (JD, MS)
- Occupation: Lawyer

Nicole A. Wong is an American attorney, specializing in Internet, media and intellectual property law. In May 2013, she was selected by the Barack Obama administration to be the White House deputy chief technology officer (CTO) of the United States. She earned the nickname "the Decider" while she was vice president and deputy general counsel at Google, where she was responsible for arbitrating issues of censorship for Google. Wong stepped down as Deputy US CTO on August 16, 2014, to return with her family to California. She currently serves as a Senior Advisor to Albright Stonebridge Group, a global business strategy firm, and is a member of the Mozilla Foundation's Board of Directors.

== Early life and education ==
Nicole Wong, a fourth-generation Chinese American, was born in the United States. Her great-grandfather was a Chinese immigrant who entered the United States through Canada and harvested potatoes in Idaho, worked at a laundry in Michigan and became a cook in Livermore, California. Her maternal grandmother was from Southern China. Until the 1950s, her grandparents were unable to own property in California. They helped found one of the first Chinese community banks in the country, and her grandfather became its vice president.

Wong grew up in Del Mar, California, and initially wanted to be a journalist because her aunt was a reporter at the Los Angeles Times. She attended Georgetown University where she worked as a news editor at the campus paper and radio station. She graduated magna cum laude with a B.A. degree in American Studies and a minor in English in 1990. She has a fellowship in poetry and later received her J.D. degree from the University of California, Berkeley School of Law, and a master's degree in journalism from the University of California, Berkeley Graduate School of Journalism in 1995. At Berkeley, she co-founded the Asian Law Journal and became its first editor-in-chief.

== Career ==
After graduation, Wong worked as an associate and practiced First Amendment law at Steinhart & Falconer LLP in San Francisco; her clients included Bay Area newspapers and radio stations. When the Internet boom hit, she began advising Yahoo!, Evite, and PayPal. She was an associate at Perkins Coie LLP in 1997 and was named a partner in 2000. Wong represented media clients including the Los Angeles Times, The Walt Disney Company, Microsoft, and Amazon.com before joining Google as senior compliance counsel. She eventually got promoted to Vice President and Deputy General Counsel in 2004. Wong was responsible for Google's product and regulatory matters.

In November 2012, Wong left Google and became the legal director of products at Twitter. In June 2013, she joined the Obama administration as deputy U.S. chief technology officer, working with U.S. Chief Technology Officer Todd Park. She is currently a Senior Advisor at Albright Stonebridge Group.

Wong has served on the governing committee of the ABA Communications Law Forum since 2001, and on the board of directors of the First Amendment Coalition since 2007. She is on the advisory board at University of California, Berkeley Graduate School of Journalism. She previously served on the Board of Governors of the National Asian Pacific American Bar Association from 1996 to 1998, and as a co-chair of the Practising Law Institute's Internet Law Institute from 2001 to 2004. From 1997 to 1998, she was a member of the San Francisco Sunshine Task Force.

Wong has testified four times before the U.S. Congress regarding Internet policy. At one hearing she stated, "First and foremost, the U.S. Government should promote Internet openness as a major plank for our foreign policy." She is a co-editor of Electronic Media and Privacy Law Handbook (2003). She also has taught media and Internet law courses as an adjunct professor at the University of California at Berkeley, Stanford University, and University of San Francisco School of Law in 1997 and 1999.

In November 2020, Wong was named a member of the Joe Biden presidential transition Agency Review Team to support transition efforts related to the National Security Council and the Office of Science and Technology Policy.

== Works and publication ==
- Wong, Nicole A.; Brelsford, James F. (April 8, 1999). "Conducting Web Site Legal Audits: A U.S. Perspective". Perkins Coie.
- Wong, Nicole; Silvers, Rachel; Opsahl, Kurt, eds. (2003). Electronic Media and Privacy Law Handbook. Perkins Coie LLP. ISBN 978-1879650114.
