= Interledger Foundation =

American financial software foundation

- Abbreviation: ILF
- Formation: 2019; 7 years ago
- Type: 501(c)(3) organization, Standards organization
- Purpose: Financial Inclusion
- Region served: Worldwide
- Method: Open-source software, Interoperability
- Website: interledger.org

The Interledger Foundation is a US-based nonprofit corporation and standards organization established in 2019.

Its mission is to foster global digital financial inclusion and equitable access to the digital economy through the development and promotion of the Interledger Protocol, a payment interchange standard.

== History ==
Stefan Thomas and Evan Schwartz published a whitepaper in October 2015 titled “A Protocol for Interledger Payments” while working at Ripple Labs. The document described a communication protocol to enable interoperable payments by acting as a universal translator among different financial networks. The Interledger Protocol was modeled after the Transmission Control Protocol/Internet Protocol (TCP/IP), the foundational technology behind the Internet’s ability to transmit data across diverse networks.

In 2015, the World Wide Web Consortium (W3C) hosted the Interledger Payments Community Group. Members included representatives from Ripple Labs, the National Association of Convenience Stores, the Federal Reserve Bank of Minneapolis, and American Express. The group discussed using Interledger Protocol to solve the compatibility issues between global payment networks that inhibited a standardized approach to implementing payments in a web browser. The HTTP 402 “Payment Required” status code was reserved in 1997 to indicate digital content is accessible only after a payment is made, but remained largely unused due to the global fragmentation in digital payment methods.

On 6 July 2016, the first payment using the Interledger Protocol was transmitted between two different ledgers, the Bitcoin ledger on Bitstamp and the XRP ledger on GateHub.

In July 2017, the Bank of England carried out a successful test of the Interledger Protocol. This test transaction synchronized payments between the central bank’s core Real-Time Gross Settlement system with a similar core system used by another central bank. The test demonstrated that the Interledger Protocol could reduce the time it takes to settle a large cross-border payment from four days to “a few seconds” and be used by non-cryptocurrency ledgers.

In October 2017, the Bill & Melinda Gates Foundation released the Mojaloop open-source software for financial service providers in developing countries. Mojaloop implemented the Interledger Protocol to provide interoperability between digital financial services and payment platforms.

In 2019, Coil Technologies, Inc. and Ripple Labs established the Interledger Foundation to be a vendor-neutral forum for the continued development of the Interledger Protocol. The first Interledger Summit was held in San Francisco in June.

In September 2019, Coil, Creative Commons, and the Mozilla Foundation announced Grant for the Web, a $100 million fund designed to support the development of technologies, content, and ideas utilizing the Interledger Protocol. Initially managed through a governance structure comprising representatives from those three organizations, the fund’s administration transferring to the Interledger Foundation was announced in July 2021.

Briana Marbury joined as the inaugural Executive Director in 2020.

Throughout 2020, 2021, and 2022, the Interledger Foundation primarily focused on supporting the development and adoption of the Web Monetization standard. The standard allows websites to receive payments from visitors with digital wallets connected to their web browser. The primary use case is for micropayments, small transactions that could enable new business models on the web. Web Monetization relies on wallet providers using the Interledger Foundation’s Open Payments API standard as a unified way for facilitating payments. Wallet providers may use the Interledger Protocol for fulfilling cross-border, multi-currency payments. Web Monetization is being proposed as a W3C standard in the Web Platform Incubator Community Group.

In 2023, the Interledger Foundation’s work shifted to addressing digital financial inclusion by increasing financial services available to the underbanked, particularly in the Global South. Various initiatives, including Mojaloop and the People’s Clearinghouse in Mexico, are being supported to use the Interledger Protocol to facilitate real-time payments in emerging markets across different financial institutions and payment systems. In November 2023, the Interledger Foundation announced a partnership with the Jordan Payments and Clearing House (JoPACC) to lower the cost of cross-border transactions in Jordan.

== Projects ==
The Interledger Foundation oversees the software development activity of both technical standards and open-source software development. It supports other software, financial service, education, and cultural projects through grants.

Technical standards:

- Interledger Protocol, a protocol for interoperable financial networks
- Open Payments, an API standard for interoperable payments
- Web Monetization, an API standard for tipping digital creators

Open-source software:

- Rafiki, the reference implementation of Open Payments API for payment service providers
- Rafiki testnet, a sandbox for testing Open Payments API requests
- Web Monetization browser extension, the reference implementation for Web Monetization in web browsers

== Board of directors ==
As of April 2021, the Interledger Foundation board of directors has six members:

- Maha Bahou, Jordan Payments and Clearing Company (JoPACC)
- Chris Larsen, Ripple
- Briana Marbury (president, CEO), Interledger Foundation
- Kosta Peric, Bill and Melinda Gates Foundation
- Evan Schwartz (co-creator), Interledger Foundation
- Stefan Thomas (co-creator, chair), Coil
