= Polly Irungu =

Kenyan-American founder, photographer and journalist

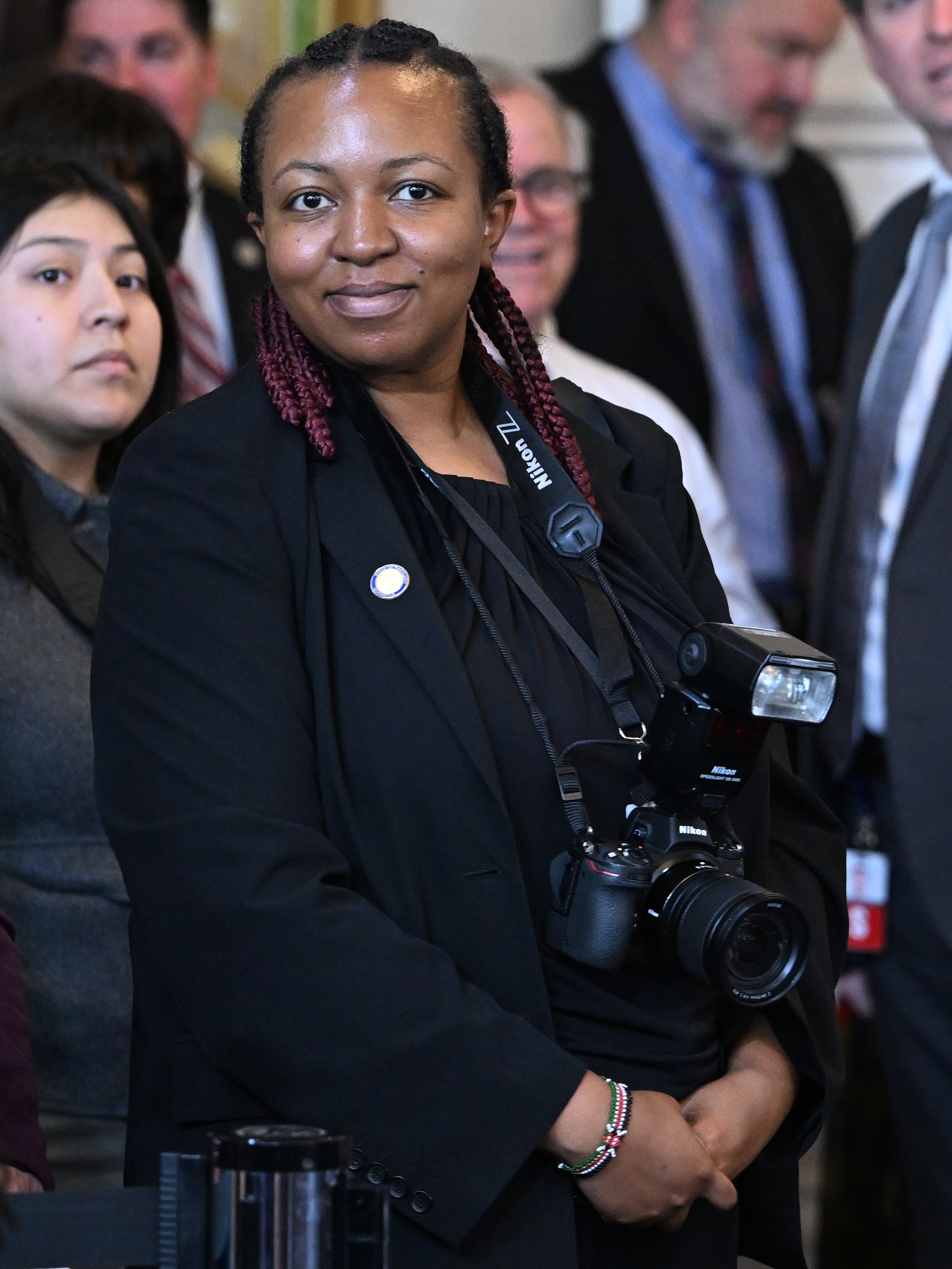
- Irungu in 2026
- Born: Nairobi, Kenya
- Education: University of Oregon (BA)
- Occupations: Founder, photographer, journalist

Polly Irungu is a Kenyan-American founder, photographer and journalist. She founded Black Women Photographers (BWP), a global network aimed at promoting and assisting Black women photographers. Irungu was also the first official photo editor for the office of Vice President Kamala Harris.

== Early life and education ==
Irungu was born in Nairobi, Kenya. She moved to the United States at the age of 4, and was raised in both Kansas and Oregon.

Irungu worked at McDonald's in high school, and saved her earnings to buy her first camera. She practiced portrait photography using her brother as her model, and visited sporting events to better learn how to properly photograph fast subjects. Irungu earned her Bachelor of Arts in journalism from the University of Oregon in 2017.

== Career ==
In 2018, Irungu moved to New York City and took a job as a digital content editor at New York Public Radio. While working at WNYC, she continued to pursue freelance photography, selling shots of New York City to clients such as Refinery29 and BBC News.

Some of her work was featured in a Nasdaq campaign dubbed, Amplifying Black Voices, documenting Black Lives, in 2020. The pieces were displayed at the Nasdaq MarketSite tower in Times Square.

In response to the 2020 COVID-19 pandemic, Irungu started Black Women Photographers, a "global community and database of Black women and nonbinary photographers". The group had more than 1,200 members spanning 50 countries. Black Women Photographers is credited with helping members get jobs with The Washington Post and The New York Times, and also provides classes and grant opportunities. To date, BWP has awarded over $230,000 in financial grants and provided an additional $80,000 in cutting-edge camera equipment to help empower their members.

In 2022, Irungu became the "first official photo editor" for Vice President Kamala Harris, who tasked Irungu with documenting her "campaign's story". She also worked as an editor and video producer in the White House Office of Digital Strategy.

She was in Maryland Governor Wes Moore's Office as a Junior Photographer in 2025. She works alongside the Chief Photographer and Senior Staff Photographer in the Governor's office. She's tasked with capturing the Governor, Lieutenant Governor Aruna Miller, and First Lady Dawn Moore, amongst other roles.

== Awards and honors ==
In 2024, Irungu received the Eric Allen Outstanding Young Alumni Award from the University of Oregon School of Journalism and Communication.
