= Victor Koo =

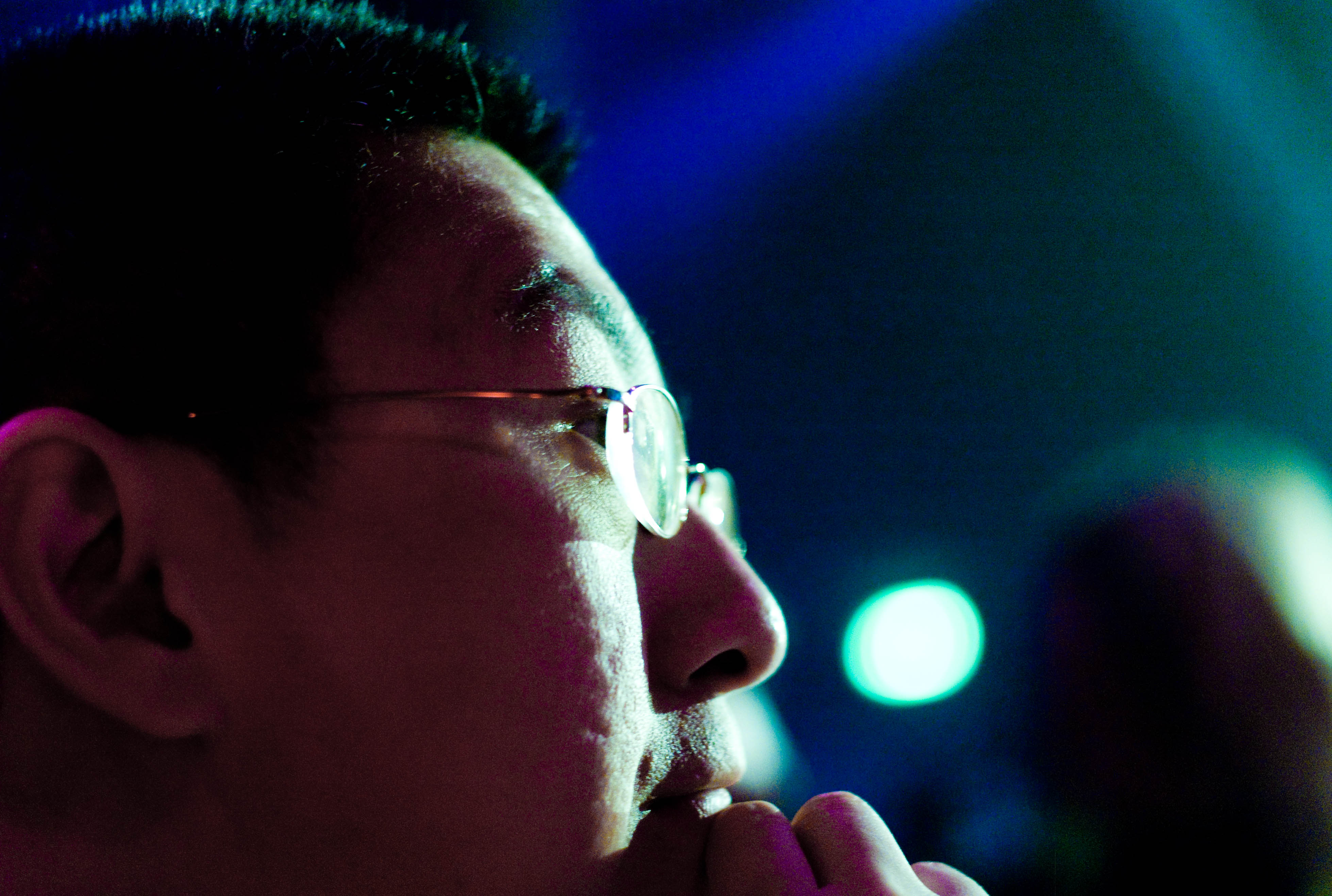
- Born: 1966 (age 58–59); British Hong Kong
- Other names: Victor Koo Wing Cheung; Gu Yongqiang
- Citizenship: Hong Kong
- Education: University of California, Berkeley
- Known for: Founder of Youku

Victor Koo Wing Cheung or Gu Yongqiang (Chinese: 古永鏘; pinyin: Gǔ Yǒngqiāng) was president of Sohu, Inc., the second largest search engine in China.

He became the co-founder and CEO of Youku in 2006, which has been called the "YouTube of China".

Youku merged with Tudou in 2012, creating China's largest video platform.

Prior to the announcement of the merger, Youku was the #5 website in China, and Tudou was #4.

Koo has an estimated net worth of $1.1 billion.

== Education ==
Koo attended and graduated from the University of California, Berkeley.

== Net worth ==
Following the 2010 listing of Youku on the New York Stock Exchange, Koo became a billionaire.

== Personal life ==
Koo was born in Hong Kong in 1966. His father is from Guangzhou and his mother is from Tianjin. He has one sister.
