= Lorna Irungu =

Kenyan TV presenter (1973–2021)

Lorna Irūngū
- Born: March, 1970
- Died: March 22, 2021 (aged 50–51)
- Occupations: Television presenter, Radio personality

Lorna Irūngū (October 1973, Nairobi – 22 March 2021, Nairobi) was a Kenyan TV presenter.

== Career ==
Irūngū was popularly known for her contribution in the popular 1990s TV game show Omo Pick-a-Box, the Vijana Tugutuke voting campaign. She is fondly remembered as a woman who was always ready to use her talents to champion a cause. Lorna was also well known for her talents in hosting Club Kiboko show which aired for five years between 1994 and 1999, while also producing a magazine show titled Maisha and a youth talk show dubbed Niaje. She later hosted State of The Nation, a radio show at then-Nation FM.

Irūngū was the managing director at Gina Din Group, a public relations and communication agency based in Nairobi. Prior to that, she owned her own communications firm Siwa Communications. that offered strategic communication support to clients across the private, public and social sectors.

== Personal life ==
She was married to Edwin Macharia and together had a daughter. On March 22, 2021, Lorna died after succumbing to COVID-19 complications. Lorna was known to be a big fighter who won many battles over the years while she was still alive. She had a zeal for life, she was a lupus survivor, a condition she was diagnosed with in her early twenties. This led to the ill health of her kidneys and in 1998 she underwent her first kidney transplant with hopes that she was going to feel better. Unfortunately this did not come to pass. In a past interview on NTV's Unscripted with Grace TV show, she shared that she had had her third kidney transplant in 2008.
