= Sarah Song (professor) =

American legal scholar and political scientist

- Born: Seoul, South Korea
- Education: Yale University
- Awards: APSA Ralph Bunche Award
- Scientific career
- Workplaces: University of California, Berkeley
- Thesis: Gender, Culture, and Equality (2003)
- Doctoral advisor: Rogers Smith
- Other academic advisors: Ian Shapiro

Sarah Song is professor of law and political science at the University of California, Berkeley. She is a political and legal theorist with a special interest in democratic theory and issues of citizenship, immigration, multiculturalism, gender, and race.

== Biography ==
Born in Seoul, South Korea, Song immigrated to the United States at the age of six. She grew up in Kansas City, Missouri, and Belleville, Illinois, before moving to New Hampshire, where she attended Pinkerton Academy. She received her B.A. from Harvard University in 1996, an M.Phil from Oxford University in 1998, and a Ph.D. from Yale University in 2003.

== Career and writing ==
Song is the first Korean American woman to receive tenure at Berkeley Law School and in the Berkeley Political Science Department. She is a popular teacher of a large undergraduate lecture course on justice at Berkeley. She has been awarded fellowships from the American Academy of Arts and Sciences and the Woodrow Wilson National Fellowship Foundation. She is the author of Justice, Gender, and the Politics of Multiculturalism, which was awarded the 2008 Ralph Bunche Award by the American Political Science Association for the "best scholarly work in political science that explores the phenomenon of ethnic and cultural pluralism." Prior to moving to Berkeley, she was an assistant professor of Political Science and affiliated faculty in Philosophy at the Massachusetts Institute of Technology.

== Bibliography ==
=== Books ===
- Immigration and Democracy. Oxford Political Theory. New York: Oxford University Press. 2018. ISBN 9780190909222.
- Justice, Gender, and the Politics of Multiculturalism. Cambridge New York: Cambridge University Press. 2007. ISBN 9780521697590.

=== Selected articles ===
- Jack Knight (ed.). "Why does the state have the right to control immigration?". NOMOS: Migration, Immigration, and Emigration. New York: New York University Press.
- "The Significance of Territorial Presence and the Rights of Immigrants". Migration in Political Theory: The Ethics of Movement and Membership. Oxford: Oxford University Press. 2016.
- "Immigration and Democratic Principles: On Carens's Ethics of Immigration". Journal of Applied Philosophy. 2016.
- "The Boundary Problem in Democratic Theory: Why the Demos Should Be Bounded by the State". International Theory. Vol. 4, no. 1. 2012.
- "Multiculturalism". Stanford Encyclopedia of Philosophy. 2010.
- "Democracy and Noncitizen Voting Rights". Citizenship Studies. Vol. 13, no. 6. 2009.
- "What does it mean to be an American?" Daedalus. 2009.
