= Edwin Macharia =

Kenyan consultant and corporate executive

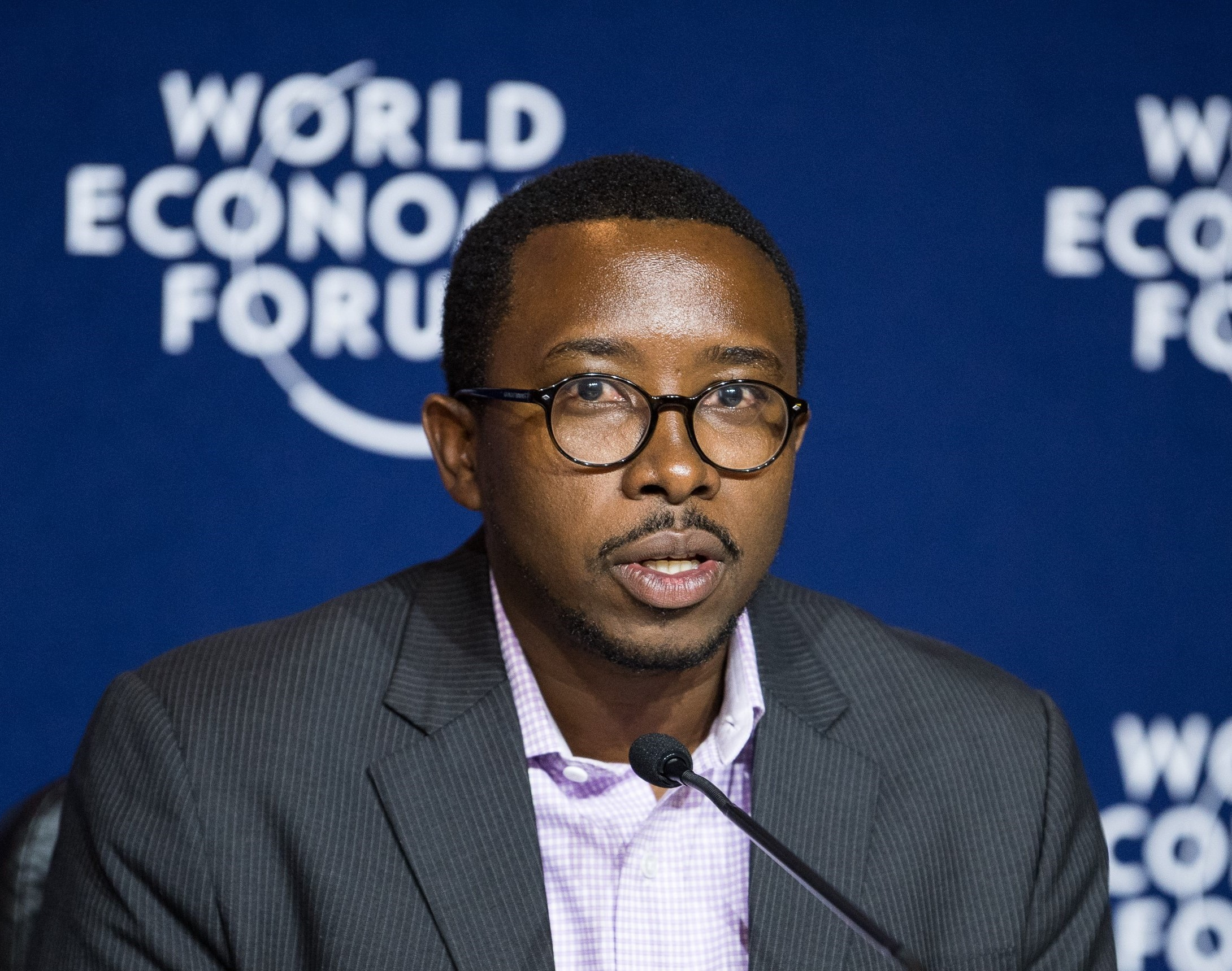
- Macharia at Davos in 2017
- Born: 1 January 1979 (age 47); Nairobi, Kenya
- Education: Amherst College (BS)
- Occupations: Corporate executive, businessman
- Years active: 1999–present
- Title: Co-founder and managing partner, at Axum
- Spouse: Lorna Irungu (?–2021; her death)

Edwin Macharia is a Kenyan businessman and corporate executive. He is the co-founder and managing partner at Axum Earth and a former global managing partner at Dalberg Advisors.

== Background and education ==
Edwin Macharia was born in 1978 in Nairobi, Kenya, to a father who was employed by Barclays Bank of Kenya and a mother who was a high school teacher. The family relocated many times on account of the father's job. As a result, he attending a number of primary schools, including Mugumo-ini Primary School in Thika, Homabay Primary School in Homabay, Highland Primary School in Kericho and finally Mount Kenya Academy in Nyeri. While at Homabay, the roof of their classroom was blown away by a thunderstorm, so the class met under a tree for a year. Also at Homabay it was typical for the teachers to teach in Dholuo, the local language. This forced the young learner to pick up the language and become fluent fast.

After being ranked in the top 10 students nationally in the high school entrance examination (KCPE), he was admitted to Alliance High School. While there, he was an active member of the Dramatics Society, leading the school's English play to the National Festivals competition. In the final high school graduation examination (KCSE) he was one of the top 100 ranked students in the country. He was admitted to join the University of Nairobi, Faculty of Medicine to begin his studies and become a doctor. However, he chose to spread his wings and joined Amherst College in Massachusetts, US, instead. There, he distinguished himself, serving in numerous leadership roles. He graduated with honors in Biology, writing his thesis on the evolution of infectious diseases.

== Career ==
After university, Macharia was hired by McKinsey & Company, where he served clients in the pharmaceutical sector and financial services.

When he left there, he joined the Clinton Foundation, where he held several roles, including as Director of the Rural Initiative for the HIV/AIDS Initiative of the foundation. In this capacity, he was responsible for developing and supporting the execution of programs that extend HIV/AIDS care and treatment services to low-level health facilities, in participating countries. His other role there was as Director of Agriculture, where he led a $100m foundation initiative focused on grassroot development.

In 2007, he ran for Member of Parliament in Kieni constituency against Chris Murungaru who had been implicated in the Anglo-leasing scandal. He came in second to Namesyus Warugongo.

In 2008, he joined Dalberg Advisors and established its Nairobi office. He then became the Africa Regional Director where he was instrumental in building out the firm's footprint, talent and capabilities in Africa. He also played catalytic roles across the firm, including pioneering the Agriculture & Food Security practice; chairing the Strategy, Impact & Quality Committee, one of two governing bodies in the firm; and incubating Dalberg Implement, which allows Dalberg to take strategy recommendations and work alongside its clients to bring them to life.

At the end of 2019, Macharia was elected as Global Managing Partner at Dalberg Advisors, leading the firm across world He also continues to support clients on a range of issues including strategy, operational efficiency, and program implementation.

In the early 2020s, Macharia co-founded Axum Earth, where he serves as Managing Partner. Through Axum, he works with leaders across government, philanthropy, and the private sector to develop strategies and mobilize capital for initiatives focused on development, climate innovation, and inclusive economic growth in Africa. He also leads the Alliance for Health Financing in Africa (AHFIA), an initiative aimed at unlocking sustainable financing solutions for healthcare systems across the continent.

== Other considerations ==
Macharia was named one of Forbes' 10 Most Powerful Men in Africa in 2015, and was recognized as a World Economic Forum Young Global Leader in the same year. In 2010, the Africa Leadership Institute named him an Archbishop Desmond Tutu Fellow.

As of December 2020, he serves as a global board member of The Nature Conservancy, Nabo Capital and the Governing Council at Amref University. He previously served as a member of the Global Agenda Council on Africa at the World Economic Forum (WEF), from 2012 until 2014. He also served as a member of the WEF's Council on Risk and Resilience, from 2014 until 2016.

He is fluent in Kikuyu, Kiswahili and English.

== Family ==
Edwin Macharia is married to Lorna Irungu. They are the parents of a teenage daughter who was born circa 2008.
