= Mozilla China =

Beijing Mozilla Online Ltd.
- Type: Subsidiary
- Founded: March 4, 2005; 21 years ago
- Founder: Mozilla Foundation
- Defunct: July 27, 2025; 12 months ago
- Headquarters: Beijing, China
- Products: Firefox China
- Parent: Mozilla
- Website: www.firefox.com.cn

Beijing Mozilla Online Ltd. (Chinese: 北京谋智网络技术有限公司), also called Mozilla China (Chinese: 谋智中国) was a limited company to help promote and deploy Mozilla products in mainland China.

== History ==
Mozilla China was founded on March 4, 2005, as a wholly owned subsidiary of the Mozilla Corporation.

The company announced its shutdown in July 2025 as official Mozilla services, including the website and community, would stop operating on 24 September 2025.

Meanwhile, the mainland Chinese version of the Firefox browser would remain usable.

== Organisation ==
Similar to the Mozilla Corporation, Mozilla China is a for-profit company funded and created by a non-profit organization (Mozilla Foundation).

Mozilla China was co-chaired by Dr. Li Gong of Sun (China) Engineering and Research Institute (ERI) and Mingshu Li of the Institute of Software, Chinese Academy of Sciences (ISCAS), both of whom sat on the steering committee with Mitchell Baker, then president of the Mozilla Foundation.

== Functions ==
Mozilla China built a Chinese version of the Mozilla web site, provided technical and architectural direction for Mozilla development in China, organised and operated discussion forums, and further developed Mozilla source code in China.

Mozilla China was in charge of developing and maintaining a localised Firefox browser for mainland China.

Many modifications were made to accommodate mainland Chinese users' experience (e.g. supporting website login for WeChat), but some of them were privacy-concerned, including limitations on installing ad blocking extensions.
