= List of Mozilla products =

The following is a list of Mozilla Foundation / Mozilla Corp. products. All products, unless specified, are cross-platform by design.

== Client applications ==
- Firefox - An open-source web browser.
- Firefox for Android - A mobile browser for Android devices.
- Firefox Focus - A privacy-focused mobile browser.
- Firefox Relay - A web service for creating disposable email addresses and phone numbers.
- Mozilla Monitor - A web service which alerts users to data breaches including their information.
- Mozilla Thunderbird - An email and news client.
- Mozilla VPN - A virtual private network service.

== Components ==
- DOM Inspector - An inspector for DOM.
- Gecko - The layout engine.
- Necko - The network library.
- Rhino - The JavaScript engine written in Java programming language.
- Servo - A layout engine.
- SpiderMonkey - The JavaScript engine written in C programming language.
- Venkman - A JavaScript debugger.

== Development tools ==
- Bugzilla - A bugtracker.
- HTTP Observatory - A tool that helps developers and site administrators improve the security of their site by determining the site's compliance with security best practices.
- Rust - A general-purpose programming language.
- Treeherder - A detective tool that allows developers to manage software builds and to correlate build failures on various platforms and configurations with particular code changes (Predecessors: TBPL and Tinderbox).

== API/Libraries ==
- Netscape Portable Runtime (NSPR) - A platform abstraction layer that makes operating systems appear the same.
- Network Security Services (NSS) - A set of libraries designed to support cross-platform development of security-enabled client and server applications.
- Network Security Services for Java (JSS) - A Java interface to NSS.
- Personal Security Manager (PSM) - A set of libraries that performs cryptographic operations on behalf of a client application.

== Other tools ==
- Client Customization Kit (CCK) - A set of tools to help distributors customize and deploy the client.
- Mozbot - An IRC bot written in Perl.
- Mozilla Directory SDK - For writing applications that access, manage, and update the information stored in an LDAP directory.
- Mozilla Raindrop - Was an upcoming technology for sending messages.
- Mstone - A multi-protocol stress and performance measurement tool.
- Thimble - Mozilla's web-based educational code editor, part of the company's "Webmakers" project (Thimble was shut down in December 2019 and its projects were migrated to Glitch).

== Technologies ==
- JavaScript - The de facto client-side scripting programming language originated from Netscape Navigator.
- NPAPI - A plugin architecture originated from Netscape Navigator.
- XBL - A markup language for binding an XML element with its behavior(s).
- XPCOM - A software componentry model similar to COM.
- XPConnect - A binding between XPCOM and JavaScript.
- XPInstall - A technology for installing extensions.
- XTF - A framework for implementing new XML elements.
- XUL - A markup language for user interface.

== Discontinued ==
- Bonsai - A web-based interface for the CVS.
- Camino - A web browser for Mac OS X, discontinued of 2005.
- Classilla - A web browser made for PowerPC-based classic Macintosh operating systems.
- ElectricalFire - A Java virtual machine using just-in-time compilation.
- Firefox Lite - A version of Firefox for Android designed to use less storage and mobile data, discontinued in 2021.
- Firefox Lockwise - A password manager for the Firefox browser with iOS and Android apps, discontinued in 2021.
- Firefox OS - An open-source mobile operating system based on HTML5 and web technology, discontinued in 2016.
- Firefox Reality - A web browser optimized for virtual reality.
- Firefox Send - A privacy-focused file sharing web service, discontinued in 2020.
- Mariner - The improved layout engine based on code of Netscape Communicator.
- Minimo - A web browser for mobile devices, discontinued in 2007.
- Mozilla Application Suite - An internet suite, discontinued in 2006 and superseded by SeaMonkey.
  - ChatZilla - An IRC client.
  - Mozilla Calendar - Originally planned to be a calendar component for the suite; became the base of Mozilla Sunbird.
  - Mozilla Composer - An HTML editor.
  - Mozilla Mail & Newsgroups - The email and news component.
- Mozilla Grendel - A mail and news client written in Java.
- Mozilla Persona - A decentralized web authentication system. Decommissioned in 2016.
- Mozilla Skywriter - A web-based framework for code editing. Succeeded by Ace and Cloud9 IDE in 2011.
- Mozilla Sunbird - A calendar client, a standalone version of the calendar from Mozilla Suite.
- Xena ("Javagator") - A communicator suite rewritten in Java.
