= Firefox logo =

Logo of the Firefox web browser

The logo of Firefox since June 2019, featuring a stylized orange fox surrounding a purple globe representing the Earth

The Firefox logo is the logo of the Firefox web browser made by Mozilla. It depicts a stylized orange fox named Kit partially surrounding and overlooking a globe.

The first version of the logo debuted in Firefox 0.8, released in 2004. Prior to this, the browser was called Phoenix, and then Mozilla Firebird, and used a phoenix as its logo. This logo saw minor redesigns in 2009, 2013, and 2017, transitioning to a more flat and textureless version.

In October 2019, Mozilla redesigned the logo for the Firefox browser. The redesign also introduced a unifying logo (consisting of an orange swirl) to represent the browser and other products within the Firefox brand, which was widely mistaken for a new logo for the browser itself.

Different versions of the browser, Firefox Nightly (the nightly beta version of Firefox) and Firefox Focus (a privacy-focused mobile browser), currently use recolored variations of the logo.

== History ==
=== Early history (2004–2017) ===
The initial logo for the web browser, depicting a phoenix rather than a fox

The initial concept for the logo of Firefox depicted a phoenix rather than a fox, in line with the browser's name during early development, when it was known as Phoenix (v0.1–v0.5) and Firebird (v0.6) rather than Firefox.

Logo used in Firefox 1.0, the first stable release of the browser on November 9, 2004.

After the name of the browser was decided to be Firefox, a team of 10 to 15 graphic designers within Mozilla began working on its logo. The first logo for the Firefox web browser came alongside the browser's first release in 2004, designed by Jon Hicks.

Mozilla revealed a new Firefox logo in June 2013, featuring less detailed textures than previous incarnations on both the globe and the fox.

The Firefox logo was also redesigned in November 2017, as a part of an effort to combat Firefox's waning market share in the web browser market.

=== Firefox brand redesign (2018–present) ===
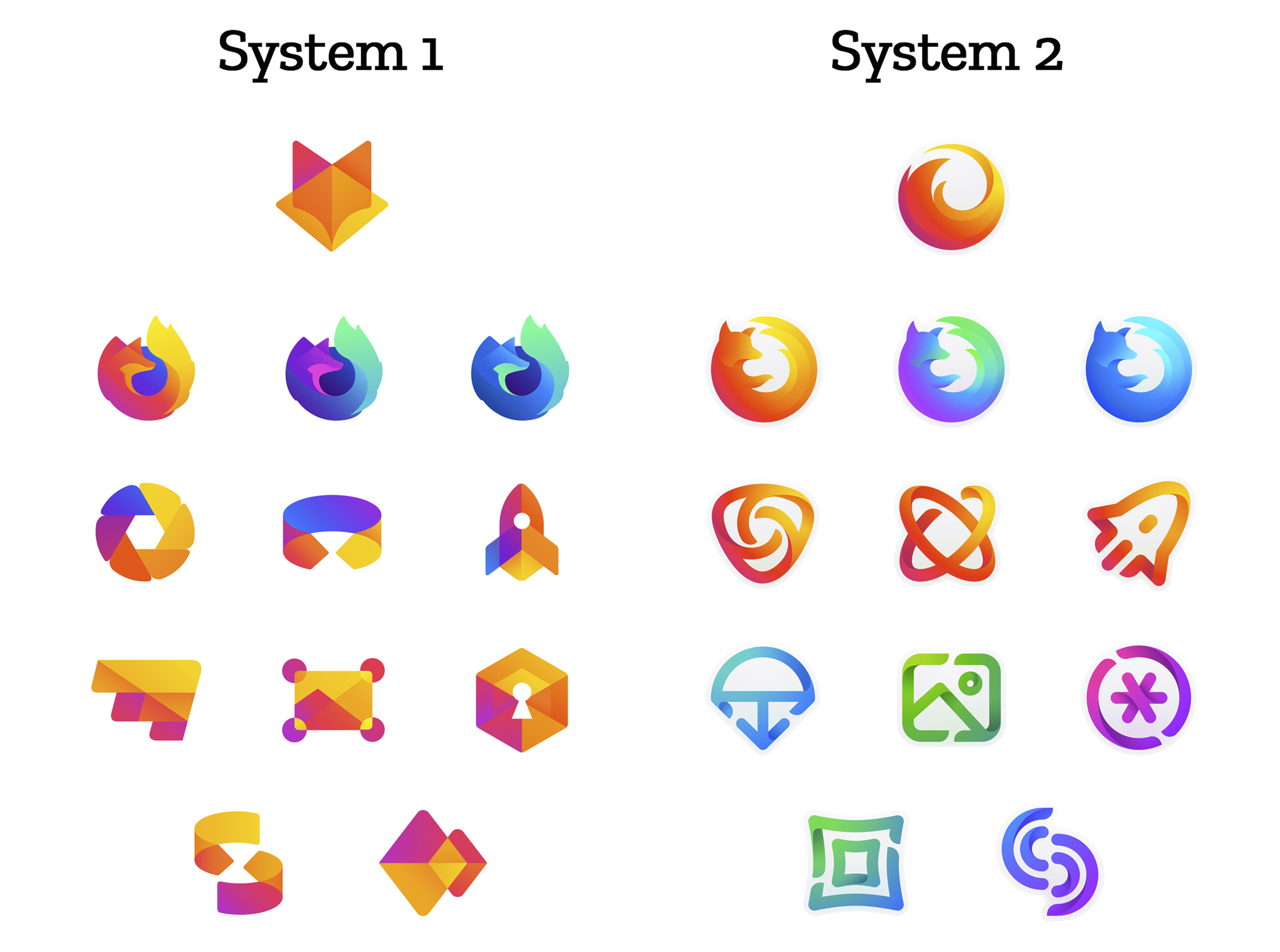
The two "design systems" proposed in July 2018 to be the logos for the Firefox family of products

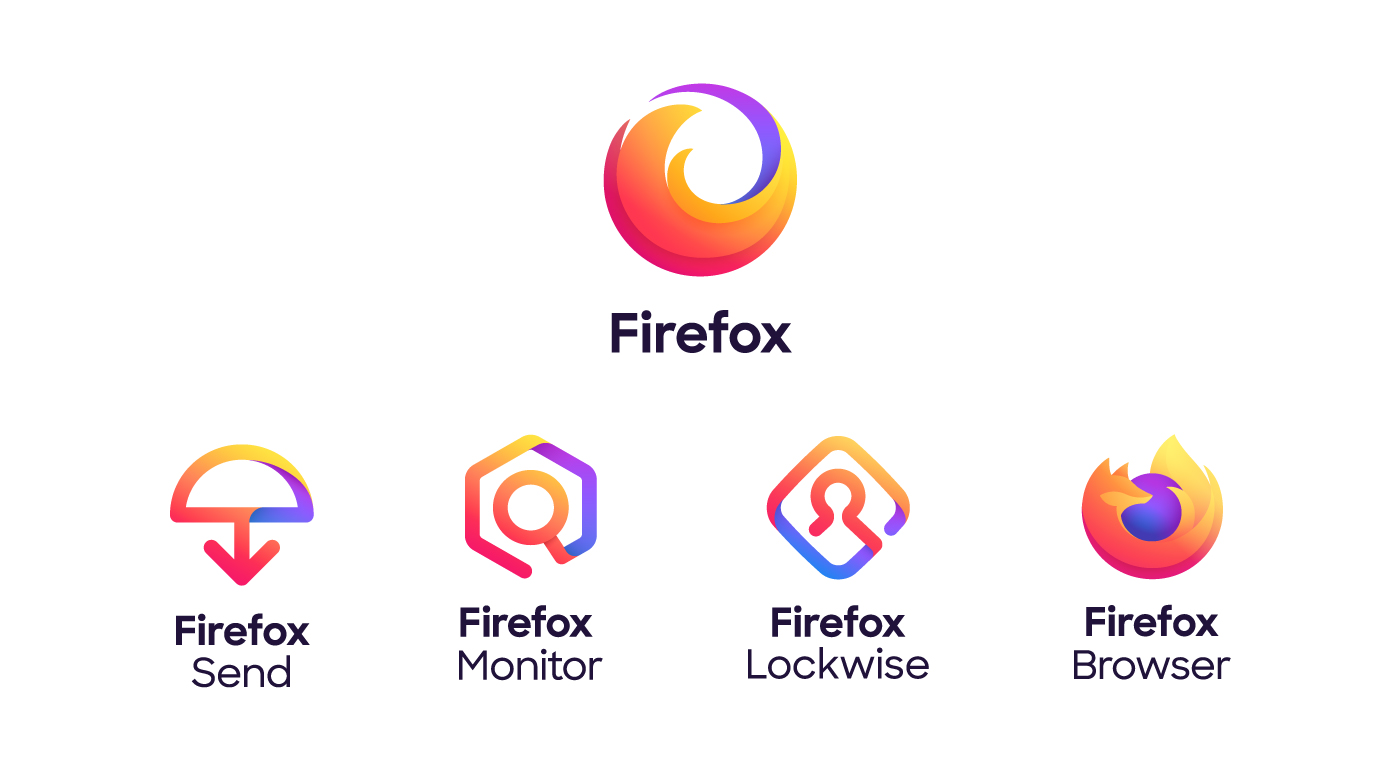
The finalized 2019 logos for the Firefox brand, web browser, Firefox Send, Firefox Monitor, and Firefox Lockwise

In 2018, Mozilla began an internal project to design a new visual identity unifying all Firefox-branded products, at the time consisting of the main web browser, as well as Firefox Monitor (now Mozilla Monitor) and the now-defunct Firefox Send (2017–2020) and Firefox Lockwise (2018–2021). The project consisted of three teams, each with a separate theme: "fire", "fox", and "free". In July 2018, they revealed two proposed designs, each consisting of a set of product logos, alongside a singular logo to represent the brand as a whole (one being a stylized geometric fox head, the other a simplistic circular flame).

On June 11, 2019, Mozilla announced the new logo for the web browser, a more abstract and stylized design compared to the previous logos. The redesign changed the globe from blue to purple, and further simplified the fox, removing its legs entirely. The new Firefox brand logo depicts a swirl of fire inspired by the circular motion of the spinning browser icon, as during the development, the team "got a very clear signal that we didn't actually have to show a fox for people to know that it was Firefox". New logos for Firefox Monitor and Firefox Lockwise were teased earlier in May 2019. All four new logos were implemented in Firefox 70 on October 22, 2019.

Mozilla later discontinued Firefox Send and Firefox Lockwise in 2020 and 2021, and renamed Firefox Monitor to Mozilla Monitor, but left its logo unchanged. As of 2026, Firefox Relay (an email masking service) is the only non-browser Mozilla product to keep the Firefox name.

Kit, Firefox's fox logo and mascot, when it is independent from the globe

In March 2026, Mozilla gave a name to the fox mascot, now named Kit. Kit now mostly appears independent from the globe and throughout Firefox's branding and the product itself, such as error screens and settings pages. Kit was designed to feel "like your companion for this internet era", referring mostly to the proliferation of AI content online.

== Variants ==
=== Firefox Nightly ===
Firefox Nightly, an alternative version to Firefox that allows for features to be tested before their public implementation, has a differing logo to the base Firefox web browser.

In August 2017, Mozilla introduced a new logo for Firefox Nightly. The logo preceded the November 2017 redesign of the base Firefox logo, introducing the more "flat" and textureless design. It changed the color of the fox from a red-orange to a blue-purple, as well as darkening the planet.

In August 2019, Mozilla updated the logo to match that of the 2019 Firefox brand redesign, while keeping the alternative color scheme.

== Reception ==
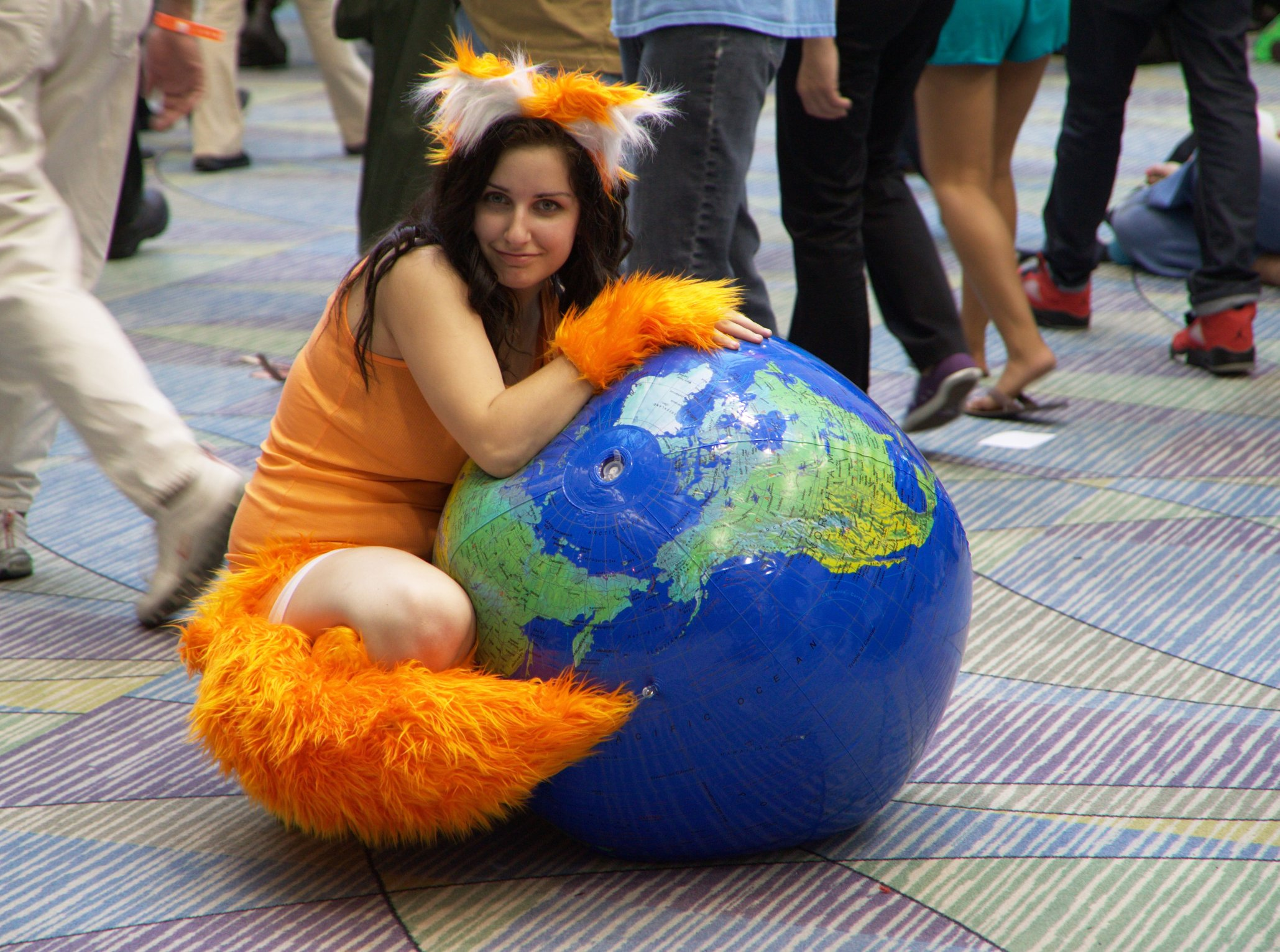
A woman cosplaying the Firefox mascot depicted in the browser's logo

Sean Hollister of The Verge likened the 2019 redesign to "a world on fire", saying it was something "many of us can easily identify with these days", and saying that he believes the logo will "grow on [him]".

Following the 2019 logo change, many mistook the Firefox brand logo as a new logo for the browser. In February 2021, several internet memes circulated suggesting the fox and globe had been removed.

== Gallery ==
Firefox logo history

Firefox 0.8–0.10 (2004), featuring an orange fox overlooking a globe

Firefox 1.0–3.0 (2004–2009), featuring lighter colors

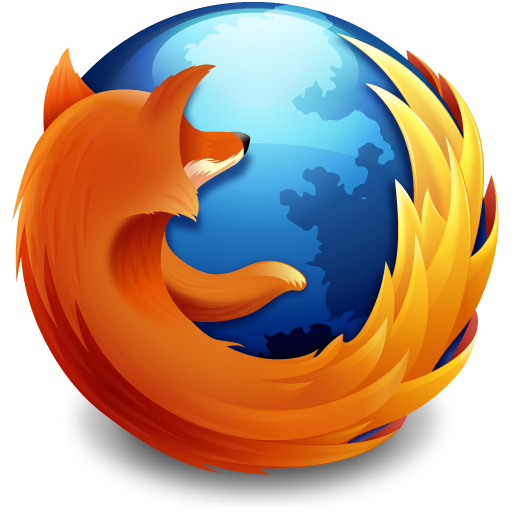
Firefox 3.5–22 (2009–2013), altering the shapes of continents on the globe

Firefox 23–56 (2013–2017), featuring more simplistic textures

Firefox 57–69 (2017–2019), featuring a flatter design for the fox and a textureless globe

Logo since Firefox 70 (2019), with a stylized fox, and a purple globe.
Firefox Nightly logo history (2012–present)

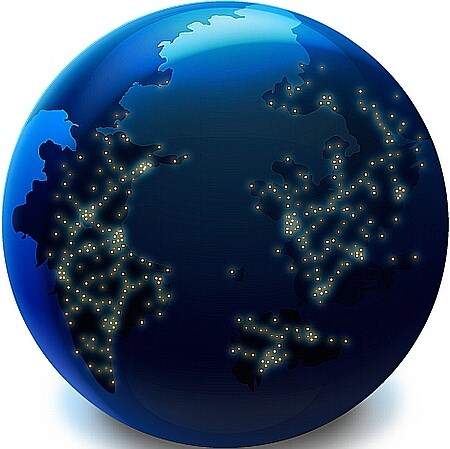
The 2012 logo Firefox Nightly, depicting the globe from the base Firefox logos without the fox, and set at night

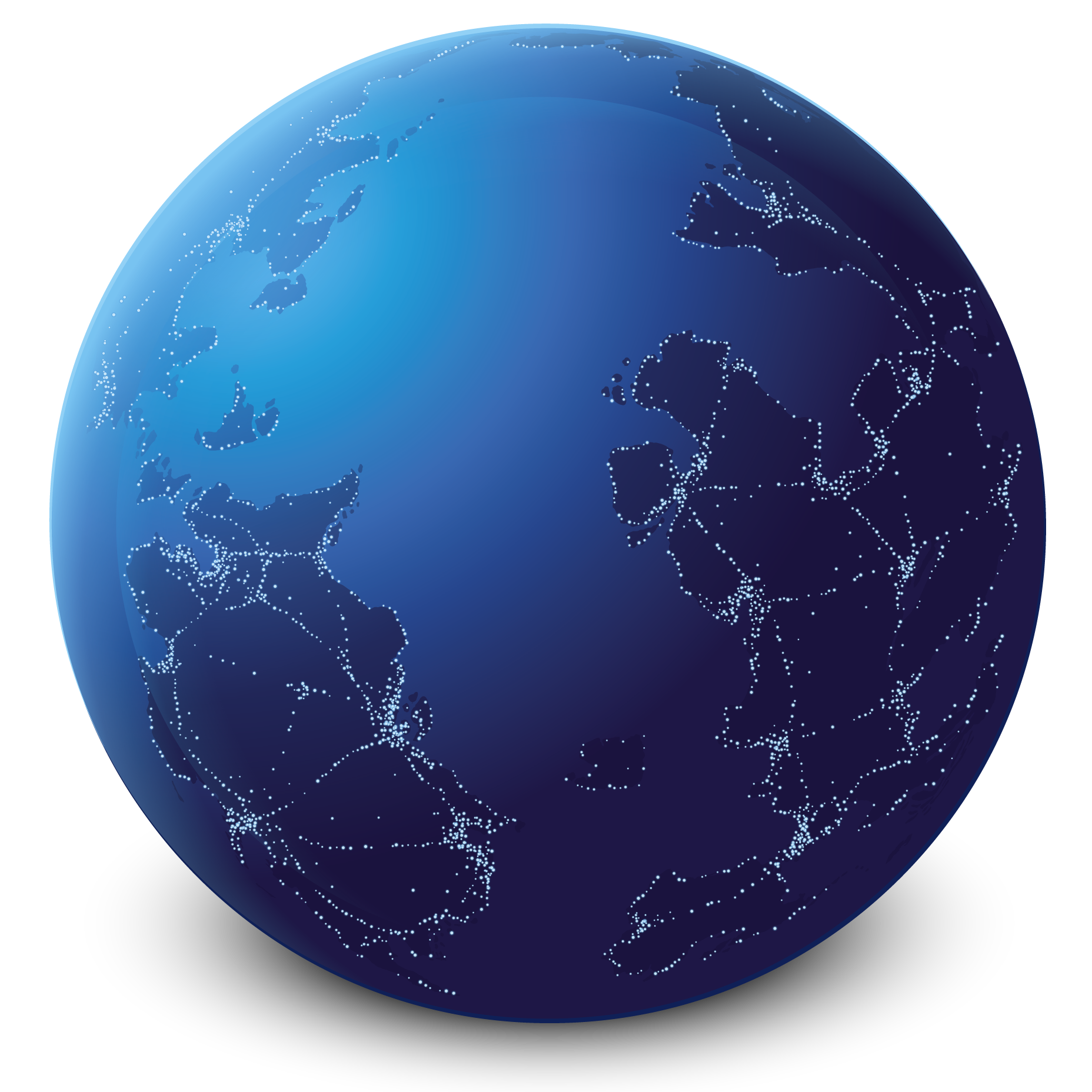
The 2013 logo of Firefox Nightly, updated to match the style found in the 2013 redesign of the base Firefox browser's logo

The 2017 Firefox Nightly logo, which changes the colors of the fox in the base browser's logo from red-orange to purple-blue

The 2019 redesign of the Firefox Nightly logo, which updated the design of the previous logo to match that of the 2019 Firefox brand redesign
