= XTF =

XTF may refer to:

- eXtensible Tag Framework, a framework for implementing new XML elements for Mozilla
- eXtended Triton Format, a file format for recording hydrographic survey data
- Extensible Text Framework, an XML framework used to present finding aids for archival collections
