= SabreDAV =

sabre/dav
- Developer: fruux (Project lead: Evert Pot)
- Stable release: 4.7.0 / October 29, 2024; 21 months ago
- Written in: PHP
- Platform: BSD, Linux, Mac, Windows
- Type: WebDAV file server, group calendar server
- License: New BSD
- Website: sabre.io
- Repository: github.com/sabre-io/dav

sabre/dav is an open-source WebDAV server, developed by fruux and built in PHP. It is an implementation of the WebDAV protocol (with extensions for CalDAV and CardDAV), providing a native PHP server implementation which operates on Apache HTTP Server and nginx web servers.

== Features ==
- Provides a complete framework for providing virtual or filesystem-based WebDAV server implementations.
- Passes the complete WebDAV Litmus test suite.
- Includes plugins for CalDAV and CardDAV support.

== RFC Support ==
- RFC 2518 Obsolete WebDAV specification
- RFC 2617 Basic and digest HTTP auth
- RFC 3744 Access Control
- RFC 4331 Quota and Size Properties
- RFC 4709 Mounting WebDAV Servers
- RFC 4791 CalDAV
- RFC 4918 Current WebDAV specification
- RFC 5397 Current Principal Extension
- RFC 5689 Extended MKCOL
- RFC 5789 HTTP PATCH
- RFC 6350 vCard Format Specification (v4.0)
- RFC 6352 CardDAV
- RFC 6578 WebDAV-Sync
- RFC 6638 Scheduling Extensions to CalDAV
- RFC 6868 Parameter encoding for vcard/icalendar
- RFC 7095 jCard: The JSON Format for vCard
- RFC 7265 jCal

== Compatibility ==
sabre/dav supports PHP versions up to 8.X

=== Supported clients ===
- BitKinex
- BusyCal
- Cadaver
- Cyberduck
- DavFS2
- Evolution
- Finder
- GNOME
- KDE
- NetDrive
- OpenOffice.org
- Microsoft Office
- Transmit
- WebDrive
- Windows
- WinSCP
- OS X Calendar
- OS X Address Book
- Mozilla Thunderbird (with Lightning)

== See also ==
- Comparison of CalDAV and CardDAV implementations
- fruux, the company behind sabre/dav
