= EdtFTPj =

edtFTPj
- Original author: Bruce Blackshaw
- Developer: Enterprise Distributed Technologies
- Release: January 10, 2000; 26 years ago
- Stable release: 2.5.0 / 6 July 2016
- Written in: Java
- Operating system: Cross-platform
- Type: Software development tools
- License: GNU LGPL or proprietary
- Website: enterprisedt.com/products/edtftpj/

edtFTPj is an open-source FTP client library for use in Java applications licensed under the LGPL. It was first released in 2000, and was originally known as the Java FTP Client Library. It is supplied as a JAR file and can be used in any Java application that requires FTP functionality.

edtFTPj provides FTP capabilities for popular software packages such as Jalbum and Cyberduck.

edtFTPj is also known as edtFTPj/Free. There is also a commercial version known as edtFTPj/PRO, which includes the following additional features: FTPS (explicit and implicit modes), SFTP and SCP (secure copy), multiple protocols supported in the one component, simultaneous transfers by use of FTP connection pools, directory transfers and directory synchronization.
