= Debian–Mozilla trademark dispute =

Software rebranding due to trademark issues

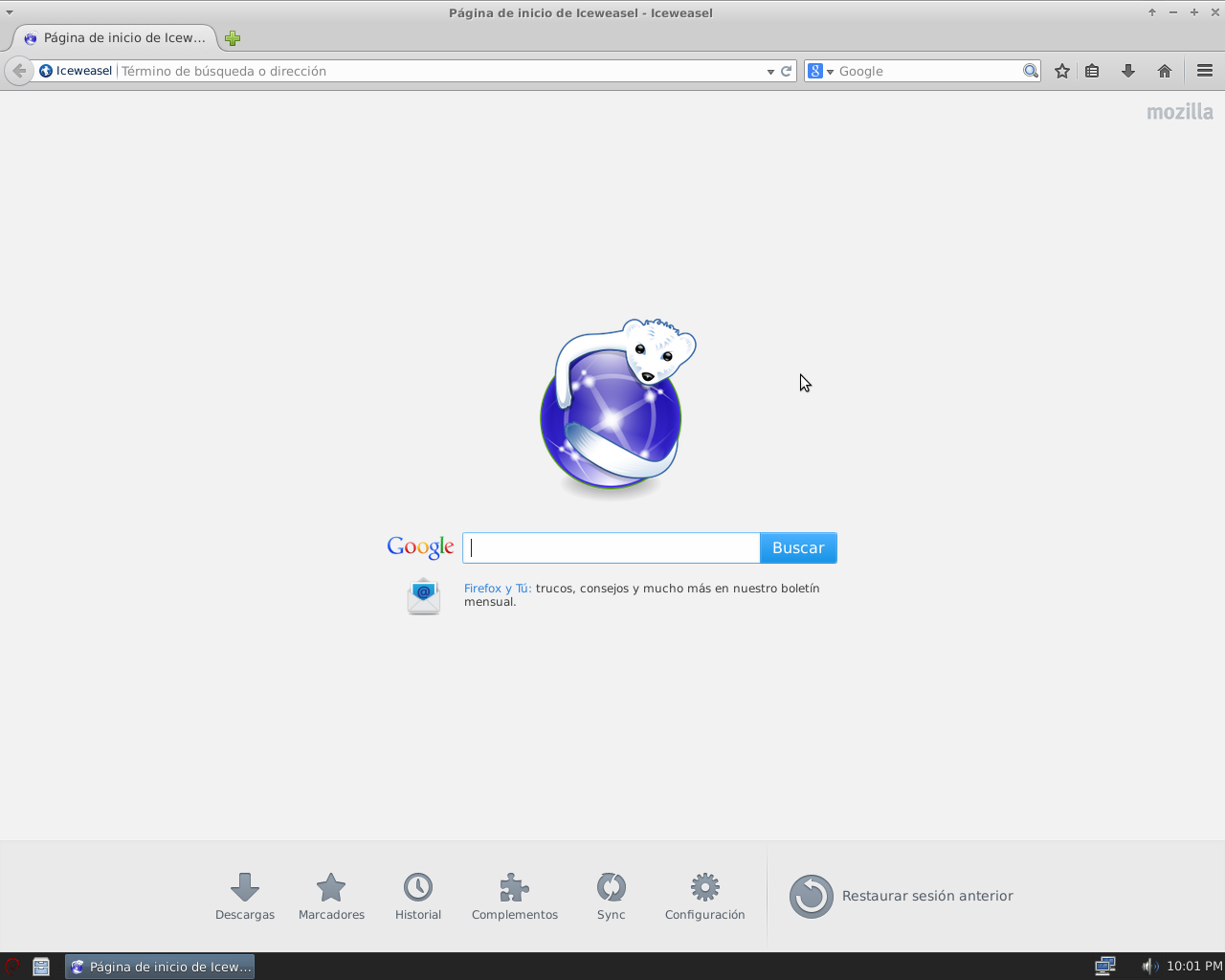
Iceweasel 30, rebranded from Mozilla Firefox, running on Debian "Jessie"

In 2006, a branding issue developed when Mike Connor, representing the Mozilla Corporation, requested that the Debian Project comply with Mozilla standards for use of the Thunderbird trademark when redistributing the Thunderbird software. At issue were modifications not approved by the Mozilla Foundation, when the name for the software remained the same.

The Debian Project subsequently rebranded the Mozilla Firefox program, and other software released by Mozilla, so that Debian could distribute modified software without being bound by the trademark requirements that the Mozilla Foundation had invoked. The new names established by Debian were Iceweasel for Mozilla Firefox, Icedove for Mozilla Thunderbird, and Iceape for SeaMonkey. These changes were implemented in the subsequent version of Debian (Etch). In July 2007, Iceowl, a rebranded version of Mozilla Sunbird, was added to the unstable branch of Debian.

In 2016, a number of Mozilla employees and Debian maintainers argued that the branding was no longer needed, and on 10 March 2016, Debian's unstable branch switched back to the Mozilla branding, with the stable branch planning to switch after Iceweasel's end of life.

The decade-long branding issues between the Debian Project and Mozilla Corporation ended in 2017 when all Mozilla applications in Debian were reverted to their original names.

== Applications ==
Debian's Iceweasel, Icedove, Iceowl, and Iceape were based on Mozilla's Firefox, Thunderbird, Sunbird, and SeaMonkey, respectively. The rebranded products still used some Internet-based services from Mozilla, including the Mozilla plugin finder service, and Mozilla add-ons and their update notifications. There was also no change to how non-free components, such as Flash, were found or used.

=== Iceape ===
Iceape logo

Iceape was a free software Internet suite based on SeaMonkey. It was developed by the Debian Mozilla Team in unison with the SeaMonkey Council's work on their release, but in accordance with Debian's policy of only using free content, copyrighted artwork and proprietary plug-ins were omitted.

A temporary lack of community development support resulted in Iceape being absent from the repository for Debian 5 ("Lenny"), though the iceape-dev and iceape-dev-bin libraries remained available. Support later resumed with Debian 6 ("Squeeze"), and by early 2013, the package was available for both Squeeze and June's release of Debian 7 ("Wheezy").

As of December 2013, the Iceape package was no longer being maintained by the Debian project and users were encouraged to migrate to other packages for security patches.

=== Icedove ===
Icedove logo

Icedove was the Debian project's rebranded version of the Mozilla Thunderbird e-mail client. In February 2017, Thunderbird packages were reintroduced into the Debian repositories, and on 20 April 2017, the Icedove package in Debian Stable was de-branded back to Thunderbird. Icedove continues to be the default, pre-installed email client in Trisquel.

=== Iceowl ===
Iceowl logo

Iceowl was a calendar application distributed by the Debian project. It was based on Mozilla Sunbird, but was made entirely of free software. The Lightning calendar extension for Mozilla Thunderbird was rebranded as Iceowl Extension.

=== Iceweasel ===
Iceweasel logo

Iceweasel was a web browser application distributed by the Debian project. It was based on Mozilla Firefox.

== History ==
=== History and origin of name ===
Mozilla Foundation owns the trademark "Firefox" and claims the right to deny the use of the name and other trademarks to unofficial builds. The Debian Free Software Guidelines are used by the Debian project to determine whether a license is a free license, which in turn is used to determine whether something can be included in Debian. As the logo did not meet these requirements, it could not be used by software which was to be included in Debian. This effect of the Mozilla trademark policy led to a long debate within the Debian Project in 2004 and 2005.

During this debate, the name "Iceweasel" was coined to refer to rebranded versions of Firefox. The first known use of the name in this context is by Nathanael Nerode, in reply to Eric Dorland's suggestion of "Icerabbit". It was intended as a parody of "Firefox". "Iceweasel" was subsequently used as the example name for a rebranded Firefox in the Mozilla Trademark Policy, and became the most commonly used name for a hypothetical rebranded version of Firefox. By 1 January 2005, such strategic rebranding had come to be referred to as the "Iceweasel route".

The term "ice weasel" appeared earlier in a line which Matt Groening fictionally attributed to Friedrich Nietzsche: "Love is a snowmobile racing across the tundra and then suddenly it flips over, pinning you underneath. At night, the ice weasels come."

Debian was initially given permission to use the trademarks, and adopted the Firefox name. However, because the artwork in Firefox had a proprietary copyright license which was not compatible with the Debian Free Software Guidelines, the substituted logo had to remain.

=== Trademark agreement revocation ===
In February 2006, Mike Connor, representing the Mozilla Corporation, wrote to the Debian bug tracker and informed the project that Mozilla did not consider the way in which Debian was using the Firefox name to be acceptable. Connor confirmed that the Mozilla Corporation was revoking the previous agreement which allowed Debian to use the Firefox name. Further messages from Mike Connor clarified Mozilla's new trademark policies: usage of the Firefox name is not allowed unless the rest of the branding is used and all of the browser's changes are approved by Mozilla Corporation.

As Debian releases are frozen on a long-term basis, software in the frozen stable releases needs to be patched for any newly discovered security issue. Under the revised guidelines, in order to use the Firefox name, approval from the Mozilla Corporation would have been required for all security patches, but the Debian project felt it could not put its security in the hands of an external corporation in that manner.

The "Iceweasel" name was revived in the Debian community as a possible name to give the rebranded version of Firefox. The Iceweasel found in Debian is not GNU IceWeasel (now GNU IceCat), but rather a rebranded Firefox created by the Debian project. The Debian maintainer has stated that he will "get in touch with [the GNU IceCat/IceWeasel team] to see what we can do together". Similarly, Debian renamed Mozilla Thunderbird and SeaMonkey to Icedove and Iceape, respectively.

=== Rebranding ===
According to the Debian Package Tracking System, Iceweasel, Icedove, and Iceape were first accepted into the Debian project's unstable repository on 20 November 2006, on 14 October 2006, and on 1 December 2006, respectively. Icedove migrated to Etch and Thunderbird was removed on 11 November 2006. Iceape migrated to Etch on 11 January 2007 (the old Mozilla suite having previously been removed on 6 October 2006). Iceweasel migrated (and Firefox was removed) on 18 January 2007. Debian's first stable release to include Iceweasel, Icedove, and Iceape was Debian 4.0 (Etch), released 8 April 2007. Soon after the renaming Debian also replaced Mozilla's unbranded logos with new logos designed to fit with the new names, drawn by Ricardo Fernandez Fuentes.

=== User agent ===
Some web sites do not recognize the browsers' user agent strings and refuse to work properly. As a workaround, Iceweasel 3.5.5 adds a "like Firefox x.x.x" string to the user agent.

=== Firefox issue resolution ===
In June 2013, the practise of backporting security fixes into Iceweasel ended, in favour of serving the latest versions of Firefox ESR (in rebranded form) to Debian 7 and later.

As described by Sylvestre Ledru in a bug in the Debian bug tracking system, Mozilla and Debian agreed on renaming Iceweasel to Firefox. Mozilla recognizes that Debian potential changes are not impacting the quality of the release.

Debian users who performed a dist-upgrade in June 2016 received the following system message. According to Chris Hoffman of PC World, "After a decade, Debian and Mozilla are burying the hatchet. Iceweasel is about to re-assume its proper name".

iceweasel (45.0esr-1) unstable; urgency=medium

  * The iceweasel package was replaced with the firefox-esr package.

  * Preferences under /etc/iceweasel/prefs will need to be copied manually
    to /etc/firefox-esr.
  * Other customizations under /etc/iceweasel will need additional manual
    steps, through CCK2 or addons.

The developers of Parabola GNU/Linux-libre picked up the Iceweasel project and it continues to be maintained.

== Licensing ==
The rebranded programs are available under Mozilla's standard MPL/GPL/LGPL tri-license. Like Mozilla, the default icons are under the same tri-license, but unlike Mozilla, there are no trademark restrictions.

== See also ==
- Firefox version history
