= Mozilla Calendar Project =

2001 software development project by Mozilla

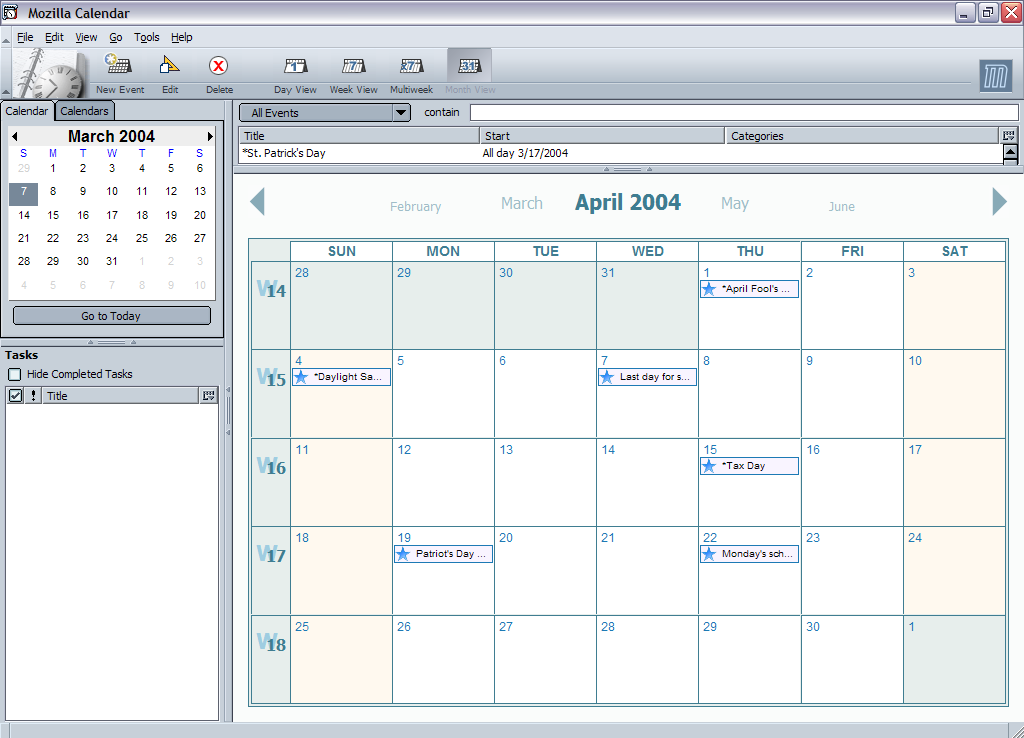

The Mozilla Calendar Project was the name for the Mozilla project that led to the development of Sunbird calendar application and the Lightning integrated calendar. Sunbird and Lightning are both free software, released under the Mozilla tri-license: the Mozilla Public License, the GNU General Public License and the GNU Lesser General Public License.

== History ==
The project started with a single extension for the Mozilla projects known as Mozilla Calendar. It was a free software / open source calendar and personal information manager based on the open iCalendar standard. It was developed to be part of the Mozilla Application Suite project. However, Mozilla Sunbird and the Lightning project have replaced the Mozilla Calendar. As with other Mozilla projects, Mozilla Calendar was cross-platform, and used the XUL user interface language. It worked with Microsoft Windows, Linux, Mac OS X, and FreeBSD.

The Mozilla Calendar project was announced by the Mozilla Organization (now the Mozilla Foundation) in October 2001. The original code, used by Mozilla Calendar and now the Mozilla Sunbird, was donated by OEone (now Axentra), who had developed it for use in their Mozilla-based HomeBase DESKTOP system. The project was initially led by OEone employee Mike Potter. Shortly after Mike Potter and his team had to pull out of development due to other projects taking precedence, Mostafa Hosseini was announced as the new project lead.

The initial plan was for Mozilla Calendar to eventually be integrated into the Mozilla Application Suite alongside the other components. However, this plan was dropped when Mozilla decided to focus on its nascent standalone applications rather than the integrated suite.

Mozilla Calendar could be installed as a component in the Mozilla Application Suite, or as an extension in either the Mozilla Firefox standalone browser or the Mozilla Thunderbird standalone mail and newsgroups client. The extension has now been replaced by the Lightning project, a project with similar features, but with tighter integration with Thunderbird.

== See also ==
- List of personal information managers
