= Mozilla Messaging =

Software company in Canada

- Type: Subsidiary
- Industry: Software
- Founded: 2007; 19 years ago
- Defunct: April 4, 2011
- Fate: Absorbed by Mozilla Corporation
- Headquarters: Vancouver, British Columbia, Canada
- Key people: David Ascher (CEO)
- Products: Mozilla Thunderbird
- Number of employees: Approximately 10
- Parent: Mozilla Foundation
- Website: mozillamessaging.com

Mozilla Messaging (abbreviated MoMo and formerly known as MailCo) was a wholly owned, for-profit subsidiary of the non-profit Mozilla Foundation. It was broadly tasked with aspects of the Mozilla Project that focused on interpersonal communications, such as instant messaging and e-mail. Its main focus was developing version 3.0 of Mozilla Thunderbird, the e-mail client developed by the Mozilla Foundation.

It was spun off from the Mozilla project in 2007; on 4 April 2011, it was merged into the Mozilla Labs group of the Mozilla Corporation.

== See also ==
- Mozilla Foundation
- Mozilla Thunderbird
