= Jim Whitehead (computer scientist) =

American computer scientist

- Occupation(s): Professor, Department of Computational Media, University of California, Santa Cruz
- Website: Homepage

E. James Whitehead is Professor and Chair of Computational Media at the University of California, Santa Cruz, United States. He served as the Chair of the Computer Science department University of California, Santa Cruz from 2010 to 2014. He received a BS in Electrical Engineering from the Rensselaer Polytechnic Institute in 1989, and a PhD in Information and Computer Science from the University of California, Irvine, in 2000.

Previously, he performed hard, real-time firmware development as a software engineer for Raytheon, 1989–1992. From 1996 to 2004, Whitehead created and led the Internet Engineering Task Force working group on Web Distributed Authoring and Versioning, and is considered the "father" of the WebDAV protocol. He is author on over 50 peer-reviewed articles on software engineering and hypertext systems, and seven Internet standards (RFC) documents.

Whitehead led the creation of the BS Computer Science: Computer Game Design degree program at UC Santa Cruz, the first game oriented degree program within the University of California system. He is also working with the Expressive Intelligence Studio as an advisor. Jim is a professor of Computational Media, he works in research in the fields of software evolution, software bug prediction, and automated generation of computer game levels.

He is the president of the Society for the Advancement of the Science of Digital Games, the organization that sponsors the Foundations of Digital Games conference series.
