= Mozilla Skywriter =

- Developer: Mozilla Labs
- Preview release: 0.9a1
- Operating system: Windows, Mac OS X, Linux
- Type: Code editor
- License: MPL
- Website: mozillalabs.com/skywriter
- Repository: github.com/mozilla/skywriter

Mozilla Skywriter (formerly Bespin) was a Mozilla Labs project aiming to create an open, extensible, and interoperable web-based framework for code editing.

As of January 2011, it has been merged into Ajax.org's Ace and Cloud9 IDE projects.

== Name ==
The original name was a reference to Bespin, the fictional gas giant from Star Wars where "Cloud City" is located, which relates to the cloud computing nature of the project.

In a time preceding the 1.0 release the name of the project was changed to Skywriter due to "many compliments and complaints" over the previous one. This new name also holds a reference to coding in a cloud environment.

== Features ==
Skywriter encourages a more shared environment where data can be accessed from any machine. This allows developers to collaborate on projects through a unified interface accessed through a web browser, no matter where they are physically located. The application is available to anyone after free registration on the website.

Skywriter currently supports syntax highlighting for HTML, CSS, PHP, Python, C#, C, Ruby, JavaScript and Wiring (used by the Arduino platform).
