= Davfs2 =

WebDAV filesystem driver for Linux

davfs2
- Developer: davfs2 team
- Stable release: 1.6.1 / 31 October 2021; 4 years ago
- Written in: C
- Operating system: Linux
- Type: File systems
- License: GPL
- Website: savannah.nongnu.org/p/davfs2
- Repository: git.savannah.nongnu.org/cgit/davfs2.git

In computer networking davfs2 is a Linux tool for connecting to WebDAV shares as though they were local disks. It is an open-source GPL-licensed file system for mounting WebDAV servers. It uses the FUSE file system API to communicate with the kernel and the neon WebDAV library for communicating with the web server.

== Applications ==
davfs2 is e.g. used with the Apache web server, and Subversion installations.

== See also ==
- WebDAV
- FUSE
