= Eudora OSE =

- Developer: Qualcomm
- Stable release: 1.0 / September 13, 2010
- Repository: hg.mozilla.org/penelope/
- Operating system: Windows, Classic Mac OS, Mac OS X, Linux
- Type: Email
- License: Free software
- Website: https://wiki.mozilla.org/index.php?title=Eudora_Releases&oldid=1061787

Eudora OSE (Open Source Edition), formerly codenamed Penelope, is an extension for the Mozilla Thunderbird email client software implementing some features of Eudora.

== History ==
On October 11, 2006, QUALCOMM Incorporated and the Mozilla Foundation announced future versions of Eudora would be based on the Mozilla Thunderbird platform and be open-source. The codename for this project is "Penelope," with that name being used for the extension provided for Thunderbird, and the Eudora name kept for all-in-one releases packaged and released by the Eudora development team.

Development began with the first patch being submitted to Bugzilla on November 22, 2006.

Further development of Penelope and Eudora continued, with the first beta version of Eudora 8.0 released on August 31, 2007; the most current releases, Eudora 8.0b9 and Penelope 1.0b1, were released on March 4, 2010.

On July 2, 2010, the name was changed to Eudora OSE (Open Source Edition) and the version number was reset to 1.0 when it was released. From the beta 1.0 release candidate 1 readme.txt:

Beta versions of Eudora OSE were originally named just Eudora with a version number of 8.0. This caused some confusion in that some users expected the new version to be a regular update to Classic Eudora. Since Eudora OSE uses an entirely different code base from Classic Eudora, in an effort to reduce the confusion the application was renamed to Eudora OSE (Open Source Edition). The version number was also reset to 1.0, which has the added benefit that it is synchronized with the Penelope version number.

Eudora OSE does not retain the original mbox data structure, which stores all attachments as individual files together in one folder. It uses the same modern mbox file used by Apple Mail and others. No software is currently developed/supported that can access old Eudora mail archives directly, without import/conversion.

Many Eudora users disliked the direction Penelope took. Similarly, reception to Eudora OSE continued to be lukewarm months after the release. The intended updates, to be released in parallel with new Thunderbird releases, have not materialized and continue to lead to frustration and disappointment in the Eudora community.

On June 28, 2013, the Mozilla website indicated that Eudora OSE is based on an out-of-date version of Thunderbird and that, to Mozilla's knowledge, Qualcomm has no plans to update or support it. Mozilla recommends current users consider switching to Thunderbird.

=== Release history ===
Release date	Eudora	Penelope	Notes
On or before April 16, 2007	None	0.1a16	First known public release of Penelope
April 26, 2007	None	0.1a19	
August 31, 2007	8.0.0b1	0.1a21	Pre-announced on July 19, 2007; First public beta version of Eudora 8.0 for Windows and Mac; Based on Mozilla Thunderbird 2.0.0.6 release code
December 11, 2007	8.0.0b2	0.1a22	Based on Mozilla Thunderbird 3.0 pre-release code
February 22, 2008	8.0.0b3	0.1a22	First version available for Linux
November 3, 2008	8.0.0b4	0.5a1	
January 16, 2009	8.0.0b5	0.5a2	
April 8, 2009	8.0b6	0.5a3	
September 4, 2009	8.0b7	0.5a4	
January 5, 2010	8.0b8	0.5a5	
March 4, 2010	8.0b9	1.0b1	Last expected beta before release of Eudora 8.0
July 2, 2010	1.0rc1	1.0rc1	
July 23, 2010	1.0rc2	1.0rc2	
September 13, 2010	OSE 1.0		Eudora OSE 1.0 released to the public.; Based on Mozilla Thunderbird 3.0.4
Sources: MozillaWiki, Eudora 8.0 Release Notes

== See also ==
- Comparison of email clients
- Eudora (email client)
