= WebDAV =

HTTP extension for collaborative editing

- Communication protocol
- OSI layer: Application
- Ports: 80, 443
- RFCs: RFC 2518, RFC 4918
- Website: www.webdav.org

WebDAV (Web Distributed Authoring and Versioning) is a set of extensions to the Hypertext Transfer Protocol (HTTP) allowing user agents to collaboratively edit content directly in an HTTP server, which may act as a file server. It provides facilities for concurrency control and namespace operations, thus allowing the Web to be viewed as a writeable medium and not just a read-only medium. WebDAV is defined in RFC 4918 by a working group of the Internet Engineering Task Force (IETF).

The WebDAV protocol provides a framework for users to create, change and move documents on a server. The most important features include the maintenance of properties about an author or modification date, namespace management, collections, and overwrite protection. Maintenance of properties includes such things as the creation, removal, and querying of file information. Namespace management deals with the ability to copy and move web pages within a server's namespace. Collections deal with the creation, removal, and listing of various resources. Lastly, overwrite protection handles aspects related to the locking of files. It takes advantage of existing technologies such as Transport Layer Security, digest access authentication or XML to satisfy those requirements.

Modern operating systems such as GNOME Desktop Environment for Linux provide built-in client-side support for WebDAV.

== History ==
WebDAV began in 1996 when Jim Whitehead worked with the World Wide Web Consortium (W3C) to host two meetings to discuss the problem of distributed authoring on the World Wide Web with interested people. Tim Berners-Lee's original vision of the Web involved a medium for both reading and writing. In fact, Berners-Lee's first web browser, called WorldWideWeb, could both view and edit web pages; but, as the Web grew, it became a read-only medium for most users. Whitehead and other like-minded people wanted to transcend that limitation.

The meetings resulted in the formation of an IETF working group because the new effort would lead to extensions to HTTP, which the IETF had started to standardize.

As work began on the protocol, it became clear that handling both distributed authoring and versioning together would involve too much work and that the tasks would have to be separated. The WebDAV group focused on distributed authoring, and left versioning for the future. (The Delta-V extension added versioning later – see the Extensions section below.)

The WebDAV working group concluded its work in March 2007, after the Internet Engineering Steering Group (IESG) accepted an incremental update to RFC 2518. Other extensions left unfinished at that time, such as the BIND method, have been finished by their individual authors, independent of the formal working group.

== Implementation ==
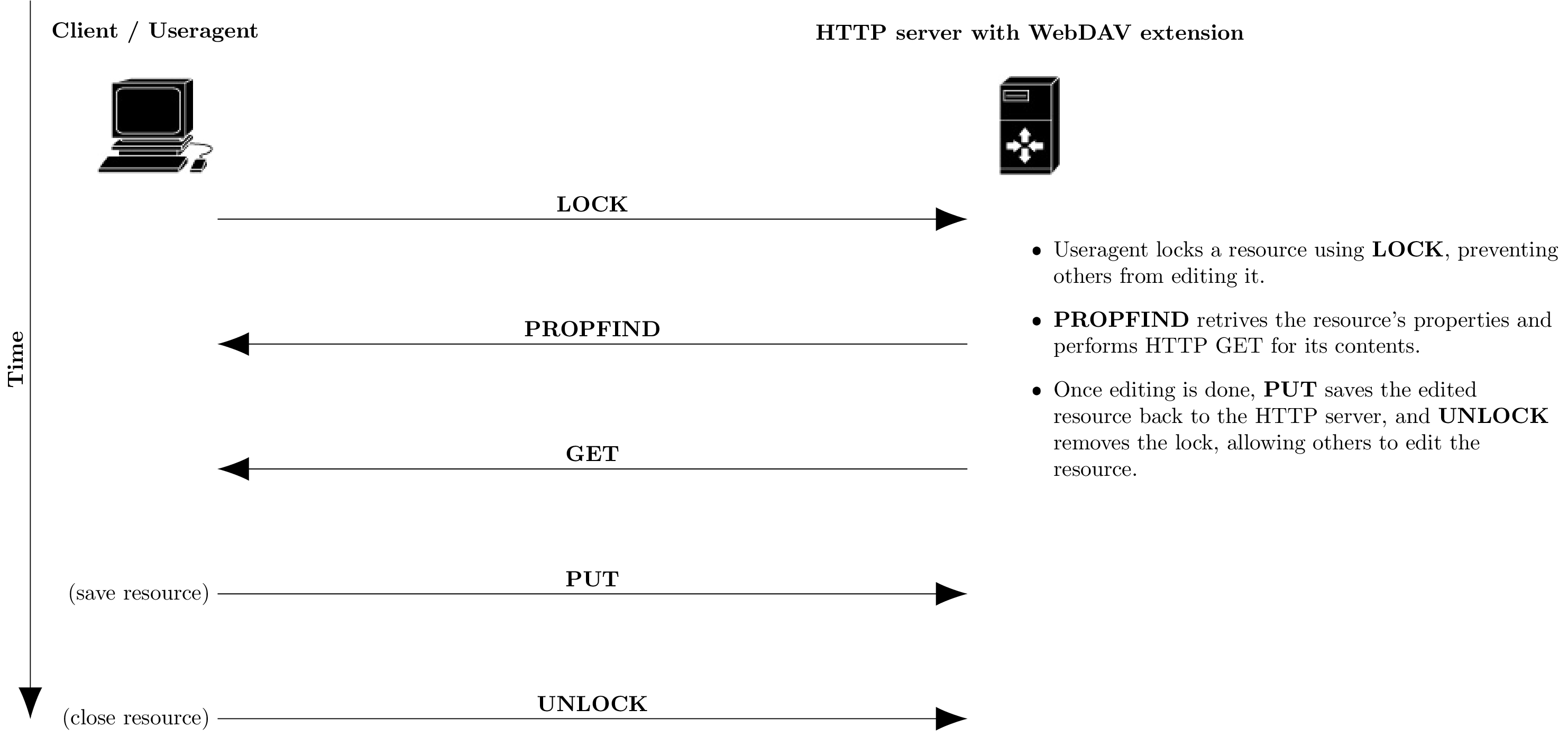
WebDAV collaborative authoring in a compatible HTTP server

WebDAV extends the set of standard HTTP verbs and headers allowed for request methods. The added verbs include:

Verb	Action
COPY	copy a resource from one uniform resource identifier (URI) to another
LOCK	put a lock on a resource. WebDAV supports both shared and exclusive locks.
MKCOL	create collections (also known as a directory)
MOVE	move a resource from one URI to another
PROPFIND	retrieve properties, stored as XML, from a web resource. It is also overloaded to allow one to retrieve the collection structure (also known as directory hierarchy) of a remote system.
PROPPATCH	change and delete multiple properties on a resource in a single atomic act
UNLOCK	remove a lock from a resource

=== Properties ===
The properties of WebDAV protocol are name–value pair, in which a "name" is a Uniform Resource Identifier (URI) and the "values" are expressed through XML elements. Furthermore, the methods to handle the properties are PROPFIND and PROPPATCH.

== Documents produced by the working group ==
The WebDAV working group produced several works:

- a requirements document: "Requirements for a Distributed Authoring and Versioning Protocol for the World Wide Web" RFC 2291, issued February 1998
- a base protocol document (excluding versioning, despite its title): "HTTP Extensions for Web Distributed Authoring and Versioning (WebDAV)" RFC 4918, issued June 2007 (which updates and supersedes "HTTP Extensions for Distributed Authoring – WebDAV" RFC 2518, issued February 1999)
- the ordered collections protocol: "Web Distributed Authoring and Versioning (WebDAV) Ordered Collections Protocol" RFC 3648, issued December 2003
- the access control protocol: "Web Distributed Authoring and Versioning (WebDAV) Access Control Protocol" RFC 3744, issued May 2004
- a quota specification: "Quota and Size Properties for Distributed Authoring and Versioning (DAV) Collections" RFC 4331, issued February 2006
- a redirect specification: "Web Distributed Authoring and Versioning (WebDAV) Redirect Reference Resources" RFC 4437, issued March 2006

== Other documents published through IETF ==
- the versioning protocol: "Versioning Extensions to WebDAV (Web Distributed Authoring and Versioning)" RFC 3253 (created by the Delta-V working group)
- a specification of WebDAV property datatypes: "Datatypes for Web Distributed Authoring and Versioning (WebDAV) Properties" RFC 4316
- a document defining how to initiate mounting of a WebDAV resource: "Mounting Web Distributed Authoring and Versioning (WebDAV) Servers" RFC 4709
- a calendar access protocol: "Calendaring Extensions to WebDAV (CalDAV)" RFC 4791
- a query protocol: "Web Distributed Authoring and Versioning (WebDAV) SEARCH" RFC 5323
- an extension to the WebDAV ACL specification: "WebDAV Current Principal Extension" RFC 5397
- an extension to the WebDAV MKCOL method: "Extended MKCOL for Web Distributed Authoring and Versioning (WebDAV)" RFC 5689
- an extension of the collection model, defining creation and discovery of additional bindings to a resource: "Binding Extensions to Web Distributed Authoring and Versioning (WebDAV)" RFC 5842
- an application of POST to WebDAV collections: "Using POST to Add Members to Web Distributed Authoring and Versioning (WebDAV) Collections" RFC 5995
- an extension which allows synchronizing large collections efficiently: "Collection Synchronization for Web Distributed Authoring and Versioning (WebDAV)" RFC 6578

== Extensions and derivatives ==
For versioning, the Delta-V protocol under the Web Versioning and Configuration Management working group adds resource revision tracking, published in RFC 3253.

For searching and locating, the DAV Searching and Locating (DASL) working group never produced any official standard although there are a number of implementations of its last draft. Work continued as non-working-group activity. The WebDAV Search specification attempts to pick up where the working group left off, and was published as RFC 5323 in November 2008.

For calendaring, CalDAV is a protocol allowing calendar access via WebDAV. CalDAV models calendar events as HTTP resources in iCalendar format, and models calendars containing events as WebDAV collections.

For groupware, GroupDAV is a variant of WebDAV which allows client/server groupware systems to store and fetch objects such as calendar items and address book entries instead of web pages.

For MS Exchange interoperability, WebDAV can be used for reading/updating/deleting items in a mailbox or public folder. WebDAV for Exchange has been extended by Microsoft to accommodate working with messaging data. Exchange Server version 2000, 2003, and 2007 support WebDAV. However, WebDAV support has been discontinued in Exchange 2010 in favor of Exchange Web Services (EWS), a SOAP/XML based API.

=== Additional Windows-specific extensions ===
As part of the Windows Server Protocols (WSPP) documentation set, Microsoft published the following protocol documents detailing extensions to WebDAV:

- [MS-WDVME]: Web Distributed Authoring and Versioning (WebDAV) Protocol: Microsoft Extensions. These extensions include a new verb and new headers, and properties that enable previously unmanageable file types and optimize protocol interactions for file system clients. These extensions introduce new functionality into WebDAV, optimize processing, and eliminate the need for special-case processing.
- [MS-WDV]: Web Distributed Authoring and Versioning (WebDAV) Protocol: Client Extensions. The client extensions in this specification extend the WebDAV Protocol by introducing new headers that both enable the file types that are not currently manageable and optimize protocol interactions for file system clients. These extensions do not introduce new functionality into the WebDAV Protocol, but instead optimize processing and eliminate the need for special-case processing.
- [MS-WDVSE]: Web Distributed Authoring and Versioning (WebDAV) Protocol: Server Extensions. The server extensions in this specification extend WebDAV by introducing new HTTP request and response headers that both enable the file types that are not currently manageable and optimize protocol interactions for file system clients. This specification also introduces a new WebDAV method that is used to send search queries to disparate search providers.
- [MS-WEBDAVE]: Web Distributed Authoring and Versioning Error Extensions Protocol Specification. This SharePoint Front-End Protocol describes extended error codes and extended error handling mechanism specified in [MS-WDV] to enable compliant servers to report error condition details on a server response.

== WebDAV clients ==
Client	Creator	Operating system support	License	Interface
Cyberduck	David V. Kocher	Windows, macOS	GPL	GUI
davfs2	GNOME team	FUSE	GPL	VFS
davix	CERN	Windows, Linux, macOS	LGPL	CLI
EasySync	Samuel CHEMLA	Android	MIT	Service
DAVx⁵	BitfireAT	Android	GPL	Service
Finder	Apple	macOS	Proprietary	GUI
X-plore	Lonely Cat Games	Android	Proprietary	GUI
GVfs	GNOME team	GNOME	GPL	VFS
KIO	KDE team	KDE	GPL	VFS
Konqueror	KDE team	KDE	GPL	GUI
GNOME Files	GNOME team	GNOME	GPL	GUI
SmartFTP	SmartSoft Ltd	Windows	Proprietary	GUI
WebDrive	South River Technologies	Windows, macOS, iOS, Android	Proprietary	VFS
WinSCP	Martin Přikryl	Windows	GPL	CLI and GUI
WebClient (Deprecated)	Microsoft	Windows	Same as Windows	service
Mountain Duck	iterate GmbH	Windows, macOS	Proprietary	VFS
Cyberduck CLI	iterate GmbH	Windows, macOS, Linux	Proprietary	CLI
CloudMounter	Electronic Team, Inc.	Windows, macOS	Proprietary	GUI

== WebDAV libraries ==
Libraries	Creator	Operating system or platform	License	Language
Apache Wink	Apache Software foundation	JVM		Java
Apache Tomcat	Apache Software foundation	JVM		Java
Apache Jackrabbit	Apache Software foundation	JVM	ASF	Java
sabre/dav	fruux	Windows, Linux, macOS	New BSD	PHP

== Alternatives to WebDAV ==
- File Transfer Protocol (FTP), a simple and widely adopted network protocol based on IP, allows users to transfer files between network hosts. FTPS extends FTP for secure traffic.
- SSH File Transfer Protocol (SFTP), an extension of the Secure Shell protocol (SSH) version 2.0, provides secure file-transfer capability; and scp, a form of SFTP that runs as a single command similar to a regular cp (copy) command in the shell.
- Rsync, a protocol and a command similar to scp, that can also skip rewriting identical files and portions of files, or skip newer files, etc.
- A distributed file system such as the Server Message Block (SMB) protocol allows Microsoft Windows and open-source Samba clients to access and manage files and folders remotely on a suitable file server. Commonly used for multimedia streaming over Ethernet and widely supported by Smart TVs.
- AtomPub, an HTTP-based protocol for creating and updating web resources, can be used for some of the use cases of WebDAV. It is based on standard HTTP verbs with standardized collection resources that behave somewhat like the WebDAV model of directories.
- CMIS, a standard consisting of a set of Web services for sharing information among disparate content repositories, seeks to ensure interoperability for people and applications using multiple content repositories; it has both SOAP- and AtomPub-based interfaces
- Wiki software, such as MediaWiki.
- Linked Data Platform (LDP), a Linked Data specification defining a set of integration patterns for building RESTful HTTP services that are capable of read-write of RDF data.
- Object storage such as OpenStack Swift or Amazon S3

== See also ==
- CalDAV
- CardDAV
- GroupDAV
- Content management
- Comparison of WebDAV software
- JSON Meta Application Protocol
- Distributed file system
- Open service interface definition
- ICE
- Data portability
