= XMLNuke =

- Final release: 4.5.0 / July 15, 2015; 11 years ago
- Type: XML framework
- License: GPL-2.0
- Website: www.xmlnuke.com

XMLNuke is an open source framework intended to create Websites using only XML/XSLT transformations. XMLNuke has several classes to aid the developer create entire applications producing only XML. XMLNuke is integrated with a basic Content management system.

== Design ==
XMLNuke is designed on the principle that content is the core component of any website. However, information is often integrated with complex HTML and JavaScript structures. Consequently, modifications to the application or design may cause a extensive structural changes. XMLNuke addresses this by separating content from the layout. Any class in XMLNuke produces XML.

It is possible to move a site from a FLAT layout to a layout using, for example, Ajax, without any change in to the application.

XMLNuke focus the development to maintenance.

== Depreciation ==
As at September 2025 the GitHub repository for XMLNuke notes that the project has been depreciated with the last release being 4.5.0 in July 2015.
