= XML framework =

Software abstraction

An XML framework is a software framework that implements features to aid the programmer in creating applications with all data produced in XML. The programmer defines and produces pure data in XML format and the framework transforms the document to any format desired. One code, one XML and several transformations like XHTML, SVG, WML, Excel or Word format, or other document type may result.

== Features in an XML framework ==
- Classes to abstract the USE of XML documents
- Classes to abstract the DATA access - All data is XML independent of your source, like XML, Database, text files
- XSLT cache.
- Easy way to create XSLT documents like code snippets
- Framework must be extensible because XML is extensible by definition.

== Examples ==
- XMLNuke is a pure XML framework
- eXtensible Text Framework is a hybrid XML framework that utilizes XML data, XSLT 2.0, and Java
