= Mozilla Sunbird =

Discontinued calendar software

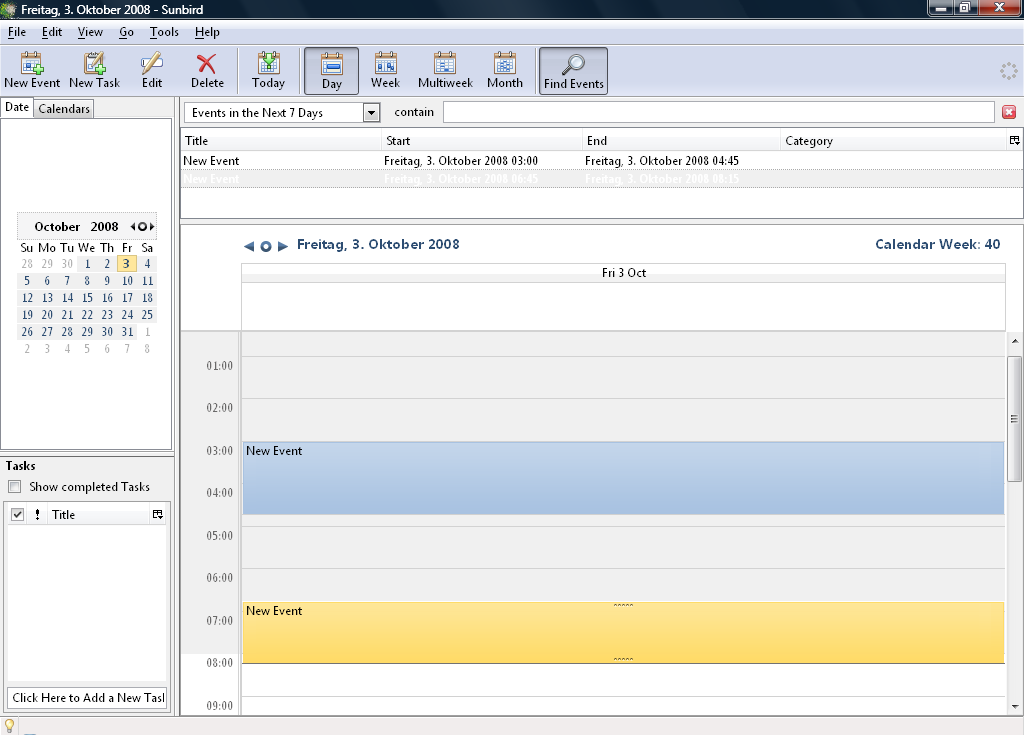
- Mozilla Sunbird main window running under Windows Vista
- Developers: Mozilla Foundation and community
- Final release: 1.0 Beta 1 (March 30, 2010; 16 years ago) [±]
- Preview release: 1.0 Beta 1 (March 30, 2010; 16 years ago) [±]
- Written in: C++, XUL, XBL, JavaScript
- Operating system: Windows, Linux, BSD UNIX, OS X, Solaris, OpenSolaris and OS/2
- Available in: Multilingual, EULA in English only
- Type: Personal information manager
- License: MPL 1.1, MPL 1.1/GNU GPL/GNU LGPL tri-license
- Website: www.thunderbird.net/en-US/calendar/

Mozilla Sunbird is a discontinued free and open-source, cross-platform calendar application that was developed by the Mozilla Foundation, Sun Microsystems and many volunteers. Mozilla Sunbird was described as "a cross platform standalone calendar application based on Mozilla's XUL user interface language". Announced in July 2003, Sunbird was a standalone version of the Mozilla Calendar Project. The first version released was in 2005, and subsequent releases added better support for handling invitations from Microsoft Outlook users, as well as connectivity with Google Calendar.

It was developed as a standalone version of the Lightning calendar and scheduling extension for the Mozilla Thunderbird and SeaMonkey mail clients. Development of Sunbird was ended with release 1.0 beta 1 to focus on development of Mozilla Lightning. The latest development version of Sunbird remains 1.0b1 from January 2010, and no later version has been announced. Unlike Lightning, Sunbird no longer receives updates to its time zone database.

== Sun contributions ==
Sun Microsystems contributed significantly to the Lightning extension project to provide users with a free and open-source alternative to Microsoft Office by combining OpenOffice.org and Thunderbird/Lightning. Sun's key focus areas in addition to general bug fixing were calendar views, team/collaboration features and support for the Sun Java System Calendar Server. Since both projects share the same code base, any contribution to one is a direct contribution to the other.

== Trademark issues and Iceowl ==
Iceowl logo

Although it is released under a MPL, MPL/GPL/LGPL tri-license, there are trademark restrictions in place on Mozilla Sunbird which prevent the distribution of modified versions with the Mozilla branding.

As a result, the Debian project created Iceowl, a virtually identical version without the branding restrictions.

== See also ==
- Lightning for Mozilla Thunderbird and SeaMonkey
- List of personal information managers
