= Mork (file format) =

- Filename extension: .mab, .msf, .dat
- Developed by: Netscape, later Mozilla Foundation
- Type of format: Database
- Standard: None (reference implementation)
- Website: Mozilla Developer Center

Mork is a computer file format used by several email clients and web browsers produced by Netscape and Mozilla Foundation. It was developed by David McCusker with the aim of creating a minimal database replacement that would be reliable, flexible, and efficient, and use a file format close to plain text.

The format was named after the character Mork from the TV show Mork & Mindy.

== Usage ==
The Mork format was used in most Mozilla-based projects, including the Mozilla Application Suite, SeaMonkey, Firefox, and Thunderbird. In Firefox, it was used to store browsing history and form history data. In Thunderbird, it continued to be used for various purposes, such as storing address book data (.mab files) and mail folder summaries (.msf files).

== Criticisms ==
Mork has many sub-optimal properties. For example, despite the aim of efficiency, storing Unicode text takes three or six bytes per character.

The file format has been severely criticized by Jamie Zawinski, a former Netscape engineer. He has criticized the apparent "textual" format on the grounds that it is "not human-readable", complaining that the impossibility of writing a correct parser for the format, and referred to it as "the single most braindamaged [sic] file format that I have ever seen in my nineteen year career".

In response, McCusker stated that the problems with Mork resulted from "conflicting requirements" and that he merely fixed scalability issues in bad code he "inherited".

The Register lambasted the Mork database with their article "Why has Thunderbird turned into a turkey?"

== Obsolescence ==
The replacement system, used for storing all user configuration data, is called MozStorage. MozStorage is based on the SQLite database. Beginning with Firefox 3.0, Firefox uses it for its history, form history and bookmark data. The storage engine was also included in Firefox 2.0, but only for use with extensions.

Mork was completely removed from Firefox in 2011.

Plans existed for Mork to be replaced with MozStorage in Thunderbird 3.0, but as of 2025, the Mork file format was still in use. As of 2012, SeaMonkey had used Mork for at least its POP and IMAP mail folders indexes.

== See also ==
- Berkeley DB
