= Extensible Text Framework =

Architecture for indexing, searching, and displaying digital objects

eXtensible Text Framework (XTF)
- Developer: California Digital Library
- Type: XML framework, Software framework
- Website: xtf.cdlib.org

eXtensible Text Framework (XTF) is a programming and data representation framework created and maintained by the California Digital Library (CDL) based on XML data, XSLT 2.0, and Java.

It has primarily been developed and used to present Encoded Archival Description (EAD) finding aids that describe analog and digital archival collections.
