= EXtended Triton Format =

eXtended Triton Format (XTF) is a file format developed by Triton Imaging, Inc for recording hydrographic survey data. XTF is the most commonly used format for this type of information in the hydrographic survey industry. XTF supports sources including sidescan sonar, shallow seismic and multibeam bathymetry, as well as associated position and altitude information.

== History ==
Version 1.0 of XTF was introduced by Triton in 1988. Version 26.0, released on 18 December 2008, expanded XTF to accommodate the latest generation of sidescan and synthetic aperture sonars with increased dynamic range and image quality.
