= Fruux =

Cross-platform synchronization service

fruux
- Developer: fruux
- Release: September 2008
- Operating system: Cross Platform (running CalDAV/CardDAV capable applications)
- Available in: English
- License: Proprietary
- Website: fruux.com

fruux is a cross-platform synchronization service operated by fruux, the company behind the popular open source project SabreDAV. The service enables users to synchronize address book contacts, calendar events, tasks, bookmarks and notes between Apple computers and other devices. The web app also allows to manage contacts, calendars and tasks in the browser.

fruux synchronization uses encrypted SSL transfers. fruux supports conflict resolution that helps users when data was changed on more than one computer to choose the correct dataset. fruux runs entirely on Amazon Web Services infrastructure. The company uses Amazon Elastic Load Balancing, Amazon Elastic Compute Cloud (Amazon EC2) and Amazon Elastic Block Store (Amazon EBS) to run its nginx Web servers. Amazon Simple Storage Service (Amazon S3) is fruux’s choice for versioned application code and backup storage. In addition, fruux uses Amazon Relational Database Service (Amazon RDS) to manage its central databases and Amazon Simple Email Service (SES) as a highly scalable bulk and transactional email-sending service.

The service is similar to services such as iCloud or Plaxo. fruux supports synchronization of mainly contacts, calendar events and to do items between a wide array of devices and services. In 2011 the company announced the launch of calendar syncing with iOS and other CalDAV capable devices and is also offering contact synchronization with both iOS and other CardDAV capable devices.

The company released a device management layer in May 2012 and is working on a special offering for Teams as another distinguishing feature. The calendar sharing feature allows users to invite other people into their calendars with the possibility to set individual permissions and gives a first glimpse at the future team offering.

fruux secured a six-figure seed round in March 2012, led by High-Tech Gründerfonds.
