= Mozilla Thunderbird =

Free and open-source personal information manager by Mozilla

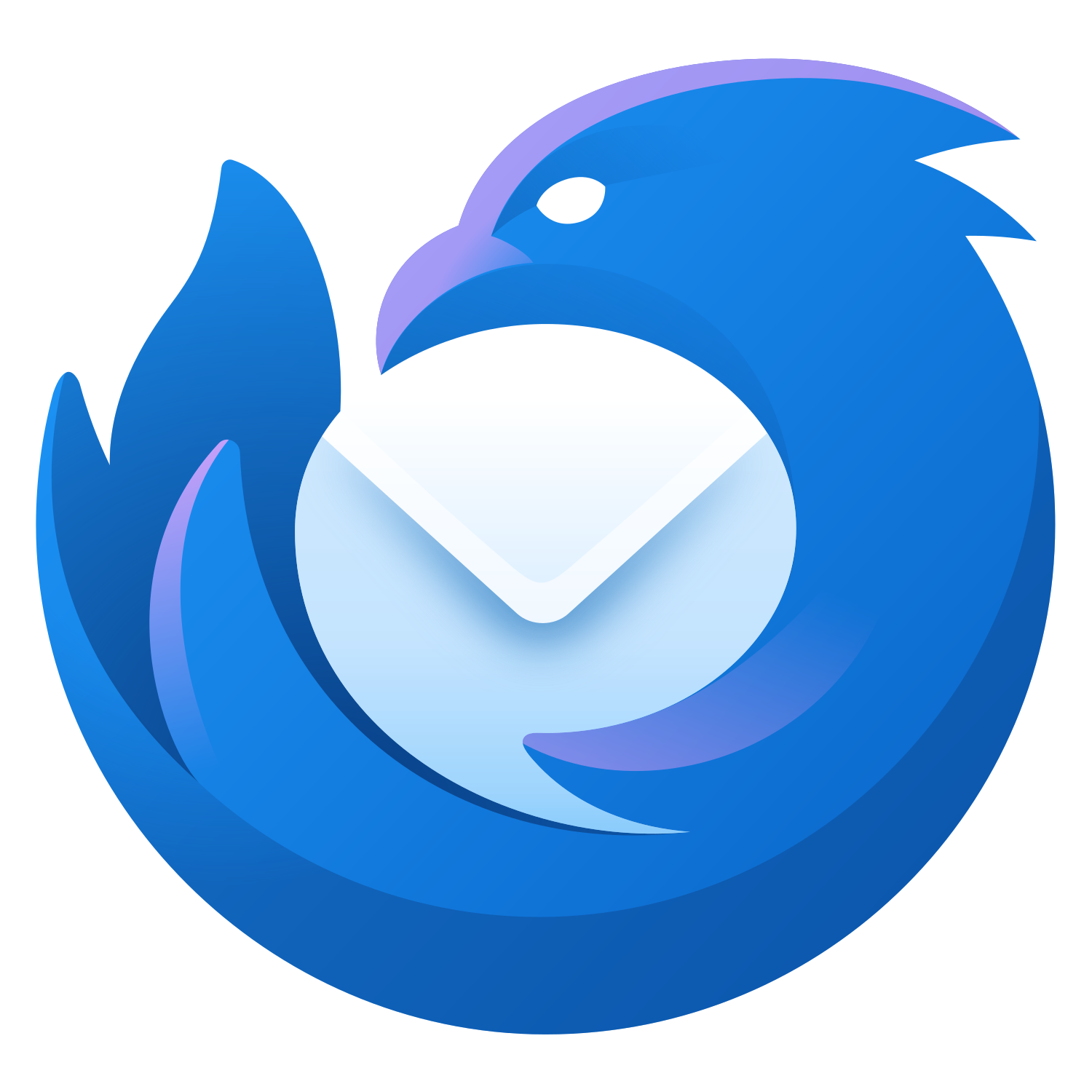
- Logo used since 2023

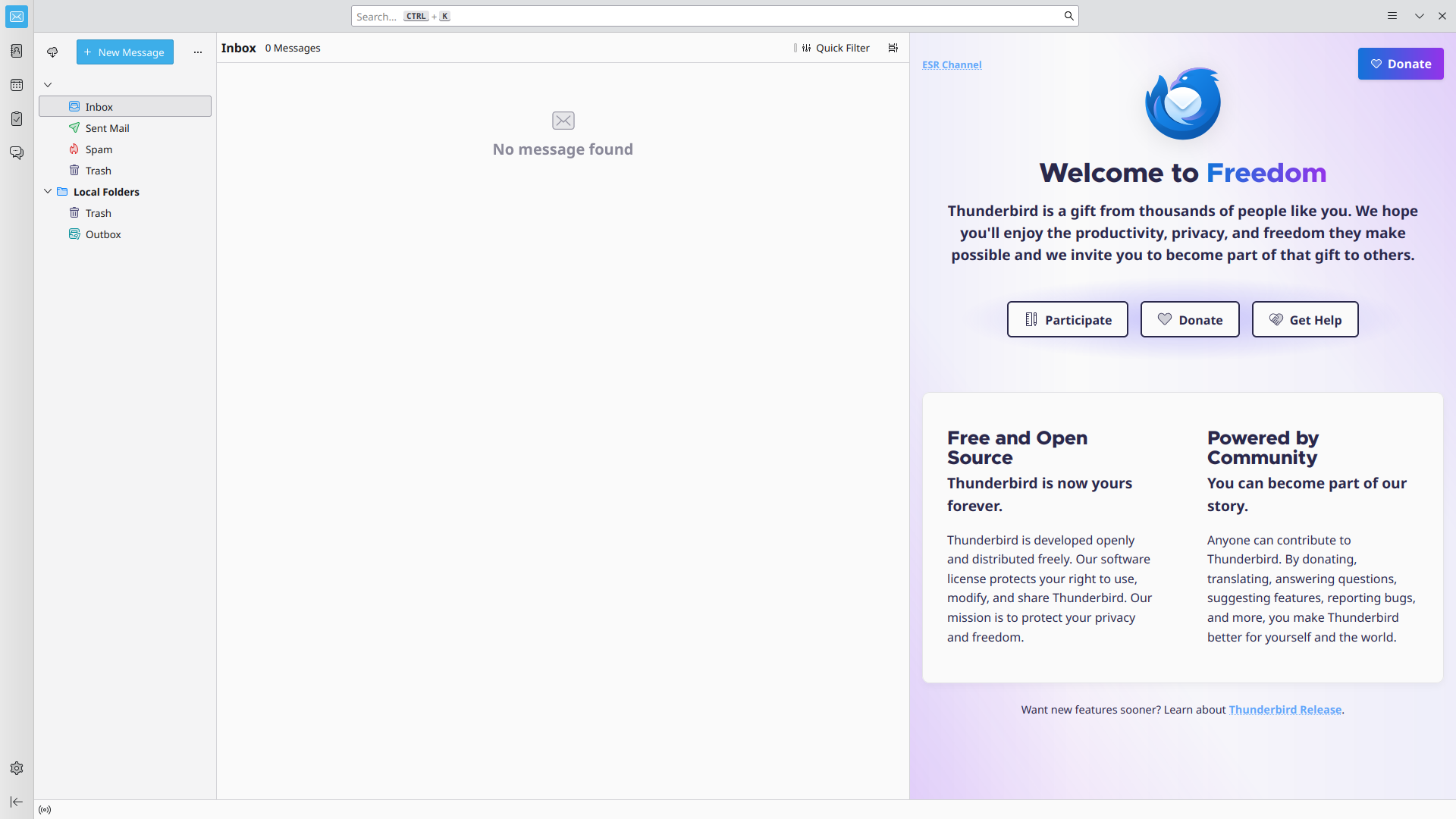
- Mozilla Thunderbird 140 running on Debian
- Developers: Mozilla Foundation (formerly Mozilla Messaging); MZLA Technologies Corporation
- Release: July 28, 2003; 23 years ago
- Stable release: Monthly release: 159.0 / 27 October 2026; ESR: 153.6.0esr / 27 October 2026
- Preview release: 160.0beta (26 October 2026) [±]
- Written in: C, C++, JavaScript, CSS, Rust, XUL, XBL
- Engines: Gecko, SpiderMonkey
- Operating system: Windows 10 or later; macOS 10.15 or later; FreeBSD; Linux; OpenIndiana; Android
- Size: 50 MB
- Available in: 65 languages
- List of languages Albanian, Arabic, Armenian, Asturian, Basque, Belarusian, Breton, Bulgarian, Catalan, Chinese (Simplified), Chinese (Traditional), Croatian, Czech, Danish, Dutch, English (British), English (US), Estonian, Finnish, French, Frisian, Gaelic (Scotland), Galician, German, Greek, Hebrew, Hungarian, Icelandic, Indonesian, Irish, Italian, Japanese, Kabyle, Korean, Lithuanian, Lower Sorbian, Norwegian (Bokmål), Norwegian (Nynorsk), Polish, Portuguese (Brazilian), Portuguese (Portugal), Romanian, Romansh, Russian, Serbian, Sinhala, Slovak, Slovenian, Spanish (Argentina), Spanish (Spain), Swedish, Turkish, Ukrainian, Upper Sorbian, Vietnamese, Welsh.
- Type: Personal information manager, Email client, Instant messaging client, News client, Feed reader
- License: MPL-2.0
- Website: www.thunderbird.net
- Repository: https://hg-edge.mozilla.org/releases/comm-release/

Mozilla Thunderbird is a free and open-source personal information manager primarily used as an e-mail client with a calendar and contactbook, as well as an RSS feed reader, chat client (IRC/XMPP/Matrix), and news client. Operated by MZLA Technologies Corporation, a subsidiary of the Mozilla Foundation, Thunderbird is an independent, community-driven project that is managed and overseen by the Thunderbird Council, which is elected by the Thunderbird community. As a cross-platform application, Thunderbird is available for Windows, macOS, FreeBSD, OpenIndiana, Android, and Linux. The project strategy was originally modeled after that of Mozilla's Firefox, and Thunderbird is an interface built on top of that web browser.

== Overview ==
=== General ===
Thunderbird is a personal information manager (PIM) with e-mail, newsgroup, news feed, and instant messaging functionality, with calendar functionality inbuilt since version 78.0 and previously available from the Lightning calendar extension. Additional features are available from extensions, which allow the addition of features through the installation of XPInstall modules (known as "XPI" or "zippy" installation) via the add-ons Web site that also features an update functionality to update the extensions.

Thunderbird supports a variety of themes for changing its overall look and feel. These packages of CSS and image files can be downloaded via the add-ons website at Mozilla Add-ons.

With contributors all over the world, Thunderbird has been translated into more than 65 languages, although email addresses are currently limited to ASCII local parts.

=== Thunderbird Mobile ===
On 13 June 2022, it was announced that the Android app K-9 Mail had been taken over by MZLA Technologies Corporation, a subsidiary of the Mozilla Foundation. The plan was for K-9 Mail to be rebranded as Thunderbird for Android, including sync with Thunderbird on PC, integrating Thunderbird's automated account setup system, message filtering, and improvements to folders.

On 30 October 2024, the first stable release of Thunderbird for Android (Thunderbird Mobile) was launched as version 8.0. On 6 May 2025, the stable version 10 and the beta of version 11 were released. Thunderbird for Android can be installed via Google Play and F-Droid, among others.

== Email features ==
=== Message management ===
Thunderbird manages multiple email, newsgroup, and news feed accounts and supports multiple identities within accounts. Features such as quick search, saved search folders ("virtual folders"), advanced message filtering, message grouping, and tags help manage and find messages. On Linux-based systems, system mail (movemail) accounts were supported until version 91.0. Thunderbird provides basic support for system-specific new email notifications and can be extended with advanced notification support using an add-on.

=== Junk filtering ===
Thunderbird incorporates a Bayesian spam filter, a whitelist based on the included address book, and can also understand classifications by server-based filters such as SpamAssassin.

=== Standards support ===
Thunderbird follows industry standards for email:

- POP. Basic email retrieval protocol.
- IMAP. Thunderbird has implemented many of the capabilities in IMAP, in addition to adding their own extensions and the de facto standards by Google and Apple.
- LDAP address auto-completion.
- S/MIME: Inbuilt support for email encryption and signing using X.509 keys provided by a centralized certificate authority.
- OpenPGP: Inbuilt support for email encryption and signing since version 78.2.1, while older versions used extensions such as Enigmail.

=== Authentication support ===
Email providers have increasingly adopted OAuth authentication in addition to, or instead of, more traditional authentication methods, most notably by Gmail and Outlook. Thunderbird has full support for OAuth authentication and provides instructions for Outlook users transitioning from Outlook's now-deprecated "basic authentication".

=== File formats supported ===
Thunderbird provides mailbox format support using plugins, but this feature is not yet enabled due to related work in progress. The mailbox formats supported as of July 2014 are:

- mbox – Unix mailbox format (one file holding many emails)
- maildir – known as maildir-lite (one file per email). As of August 2019 "there are still many bugs", so this is disabled by default.

Thunderbird also uses Mork and (since version 3) MozStorage (which is based on SQLite) for its internal database. Mork was due to be replaced with MozStorage in Thunderbird 3.0, but the 8.0 release still uses the Mork file format.

=== Large file linking ===
Since version 13, Thunderbird has integrated support for uploading files to online file storage services. Users can link large files instead of attaching them directly to the email message. Supported providers included Ubuntu One and Dropbox. Currently, file linking can be used through add-ons or by connecting to a WebDAV provider.

=== HTML formatting and code insertion ===
Thunderbird provides a wysiwyg editor for composing messages formatted with HTML (default). The delivery format auto-detect feature will send unformatted messages as plain text (controlled by a user preference). Certain special formatting like subscript, superscript and strikethrough is available from the Format menu. The Insert > HTML menu provides the ability to edit the HTML source code of the message. There is basic support for HTML template messages, which are stored in a dedicated templates folder for each account.

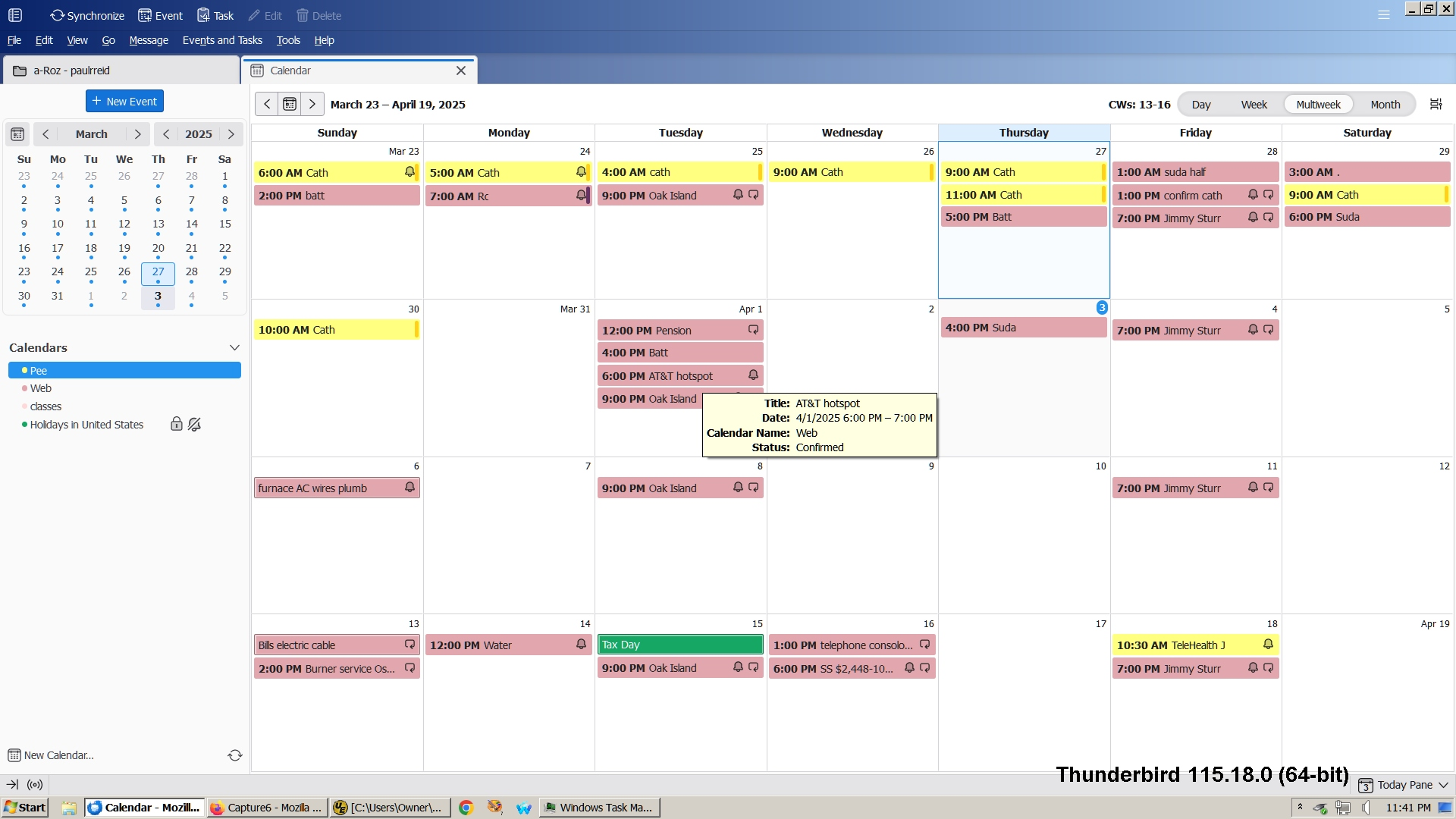
Mozilla Thunderbird calendar screen

Markdown support is provided through the Markdown Here Revival add-on.

=== Security ===
Thunderbird provides security features such as TLS/SSL connections to IMAP and SMTP servers. It also offers inbuilt support for secure email with digital signing and message encryption through OpenPGP (using public and private keys) or S/MIME (using certificates). Any of these security features can take advantage of smartcards with the installation of additional extensions.

Other security features may be added through extensions. Up to version 68, the Enigmail extension was required for OpenPGP support (now inbuilt).

Optional security protections also include disabling loading of remote images within messages, enabling only specific media types (sanitizer), and disabling JavaScript.

The French military uses Thunderbird and contributes to its security features, which are claimed to match the requirements for NATO's closed messaging system.

=== Limitations and known issues ===
As with any software, there may be limitations to the number and sizes of files and objects represented. For example, POP3 folders are subject to filesystem design limitations, such as maximum file sizes on filesystems that do not have large-file support, as well as possible limitations of long filenames, and other issues.

== Other features ==
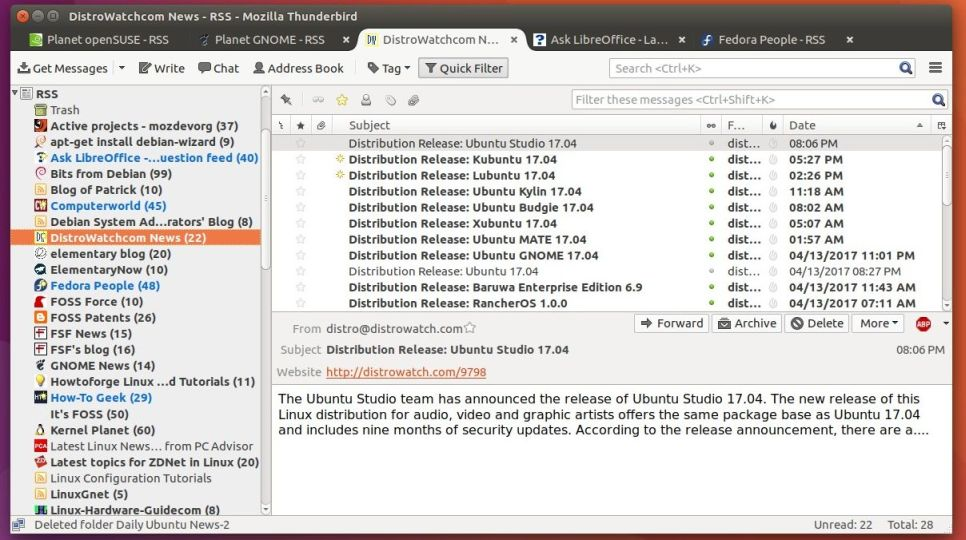
Thunderbird on Ubuntu Linux, being used as an RSS feed reader

While primarily used as an email client, Thunderbird is also a news aggregator, which is named News Feeds and Blogs in the application. It supports RSS and more recently added Atom as well.

The software has a chat client for instant messaging, supporting the IRC, XMPP, and (since version 102) Matrix protocols. In the past, it also had support for Twitter, Google Talk, Facebook Chat, and Odnoklassniki.

Thunderbird is also a newsreader for Usenet, using the NNTP protocol and supports NNTPS. Intended for reading use, it does not support NZB for binary downloading, nor does it have a search function for the newsgroups.

As of version 91, Thunderbird introduced a built-in PDF document reader, allowing users to open and view PDF attachments or files directly within the application without needing an external PDF viewer.

== Cross-platform support ==
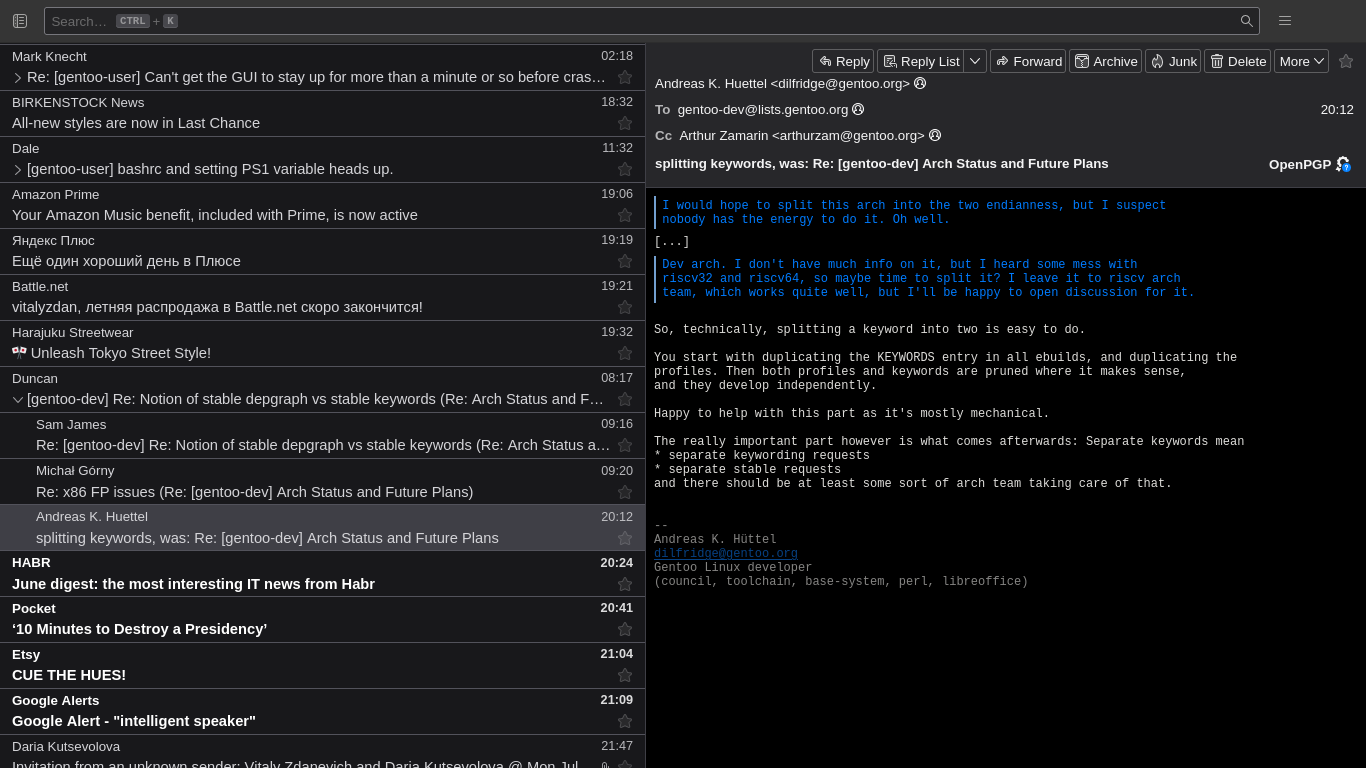
Dark mode, minimal UI, hide tabs with the extension

Thunderbird runs on a variety of platforms. Releases available on the primary distribution site support the following operating systems:

- Linux
- Windows
- macOS

Unofficial ports are available for:

- FreeBSD
- NetBSD, via pkgsrc
- OpenBSD

Ports for older versions available for OS/2 (including ArcaOS and eComStation).

The source code is freely available and can be compiled to be run on a variety of other architectures and operating systems.

=== Android and iOS versions ===
In June 2022, the Thunderbird project announced that it would be collaborating with email client K-9 for Android to build a Thunderbird version for Android. To this end, K-9 lead developer Christian Ketterer joined the Thunderbird team in 2022. The plan was to transform K-9 Mail into Thunderbird on Android, including the respective name change and adoption of the Thunderbird branding. As soon as K-9 Mail had been brought into alignment with Thunderbird's feature set and visual appearance, this changeover would take place, according to Thunderbird's Jason Evangelho.

In the 2022 Financial Report published on May 8, 2023, Ryan Sipes (Product and Business Development Manager) mentions plans of hiring an iOS developer later that same year to start laying the foundation for Thunderbird on iOS.

On 30 October 2024, the first stable release of Thunderbird for Android (Thunderbird Mobile) was launched as version 8.0. Thunderbird for Android can be installed via Google Play and F-Droid, among others. The Thunderbird team had planned in 2022 to maintain K-9 for one year after the release of Thunderbird Mobile, i.e. until roughly October 2025.

On 6 May 2025, the stable version 10 of Thunderbird Mobile and the beta of version 11 were released.

As of 2025, an initial version of Thunderbird's iOS client was available via Apple's TestFlight.

=== Release compatibility ===
Operating system		Latest stable version	Support status
Windows	10 and later, Server 2016 and later	159.0 (x64)	2018–present
Windows	10 and later, Server 2016 and later	153.6.0esr (x64)	2018–present
Windows	10 and later, Server 2016 and later	159.0 (IA-32)	2015–present
Windows	10 and later, Server 2016 and later	153.6.0esr (IA-32)	2015–present
Windows	7, Server 2008 R2, 8, Server 2012, 8.1 and Server 2012 R2	115.18.0esr (x64)	2018–2024
Windows	7, Server 2008 R2, 8, Server 2012, 8.1 and Server 2012 R2	115.18.0esr (IA-32)	2009–2024
Windows	XP, Server 2003, Vista and Server 2008	52.9.1 (IA-32)	2004–2018
Windows	2000	12.0.1	2004–2012
Windows	2000	10.0.12esr	2004–2013
Windows	NT 4.0 (IA-32), 98 and Me	2.0.0.24	2004–2010
Windows	95	1.5.0.14	2004–2007
macOS	11 (ARM64) and later	159.0	2021–present
macOS	11 (ARM64) and later	153.6.0esr	2021–present
macOS	10.15 (x64) and later	159.0	2019–present
macOS	10.15 (x64) and later	153.6.0esr	2019–present
macOS	10.12–10.14	115.18.0esr	2016–2024
macOS	10.9–10.11	78.14.0	2013–2021
macOS	10.6–10.8	45.8.0	2009–2017
macOS	10.5 (IA-32 and x64)	16.0.2	2007–2012
macOS	10.5 (IA-32 and x64)	10.0.12esr	2007–2013
macOS	10.4 (IA-32 and PPC)–10.5 (PPC)	3.1.20	2005–2012
macOS	10.2–10.3	2.0.0.24	2004–2010
macOS	10.0–10.1	1.0.8	2004–2006
Linux (X11/Wayland)		159.0 (x64)	2011–present
Linux (X11/Wayland)		153.6.0esr (x64)	2011–present
Linux (X11/Wayland)		153.6.0esr (IA-32)	2004–2026
Linux (X11/Wayland)		144.0.1 (IA-32)	2004–2025

Legend:
Unsupported
Supported
Latest version

=== Unofficial ports ===
Operating system		Status
RHEL	10	current (ESR (ARM64))
RHEL	10	current (ESR (s390x))
RHEL	4	historic (1.5.0.12 (s390))
RHEL	4	historic (1.5.0.12 (IA-64))
Solaris	11	current (ESR (x64, SPARC V9))
Solaris	10 and OpenSolaris	historic (52.9.1 (IA-32, x64, SPARC V9))
Solaris	8–9	historic (2.0.0.24 (IA-32, SPARC V9))
OpenIndiana	Hipster	current (ESR (x64))
HP-UX	11i v1–v3	historic (2.0.0.24 (IA-64, PA-RISC))
FreeBSD (Tier 1)	13 and later	current (x64, ARM64)
FreeBSD (Tier 1)	13 and later	current (ESR (x64, ARM64))
FreeBSD (Tier 1)	12	historic (115.6.0 (IA-32))
OpenBSD -stable	7.8	current (ESR (x64, ARM64, RISC-V))
OpenBSD -stable	6.9	historic (78.14.0 (IA-32))

== History and development ==
=== 2003—2010 ===
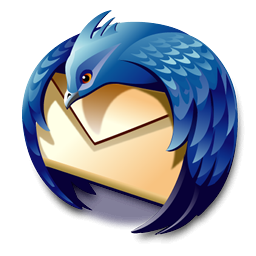
Logo of Thunderbird 2004–2009

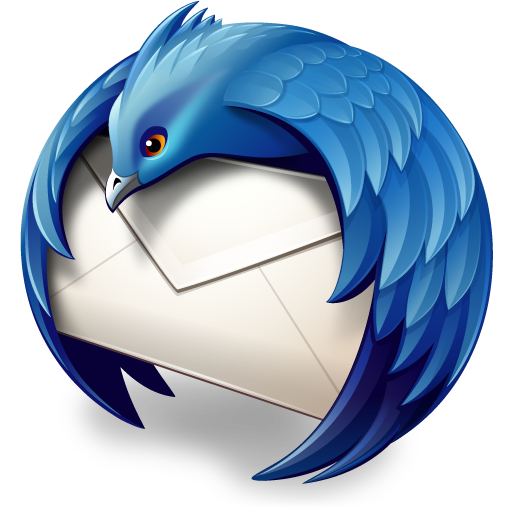
Logo of Thunderbird 2009–2018

Originally launched as Minotaur shortly after Phoenix (the original name for Mozilla Firefox), the project failed to gain momentum. With the success of Firefox, however, demand increased for a mail client to go with it, and the work on Minotaur was revived under the new name of Thunderbird, and migrated to the new toolkit developed by the Firefox team.

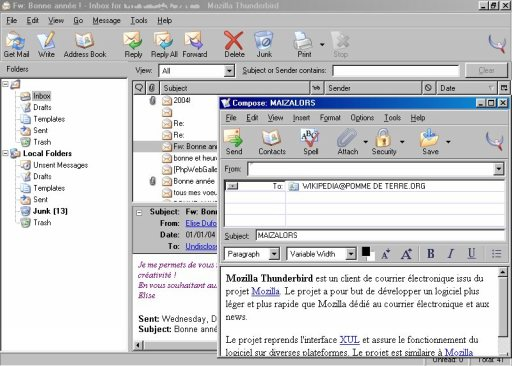
A pre-release version of Thunderbird

On December 7, 2004, version 1.0 was released, and received more than 500,000 downloads in its first three days of release, and 1,000,000 in ten days.

Significant work on Thunderbird restarted with the announcement that from version 1.5 onward the main Mozilla suite would be designed around separate applications using this new toolkit. This contrasts with the previous all-in-one approach, allowing users to mix and match the Mozilla applications with alternatives. The original Mozilla Suite continues to be developed as SeaMonkey.

On December 23, 2004, Project Lightning was announced which tightly integrated calendar functionality (scheduling, tasks, etc.) into Thunderbird. Lightning supports the full range of calendar mechanisms and protocols supported by the Mozilla Calendar infrastructure, just as with modern (post-0.2) Sunbird.

On October 11, 2006, Qualcomm and the Mozilla Foundation announced that "future versions of Eudora will be based upon the same technology platform as the open source Mozilla Thunderbird email program." The project was code-named Penelope.

In late 2006, Debian rebranded Thunderbird as Icedove due to trademark and copyright reasons. This was the second product to be rebranded.

On July 26, 2007, the Mozilla Foundation announced that Thunderbird would be developed by an independent organization, because the Mozilla Corporation (a subsidiary of the foundation) was focusing on Mozilla Firefox development.

On September 17, 2007, the Mozilla Foundation announced the funding of a new internet communications initiative with David Ascher of ActiveState. The purpose of this initiative was "to develop Internet communications software based on the Thunderbird product, code, and brand".

On February 19, 2008, Mozilla Messaging started operations as a subsidiary of the Mozilla Foundation responsible for the development of email and similar communications. Its initial focus was on the then upcoming version of Thunderbird 3. Alpha Preview releases of Thunderbird 3 were codenamed "Shredder".

=== 2011—2016 ===
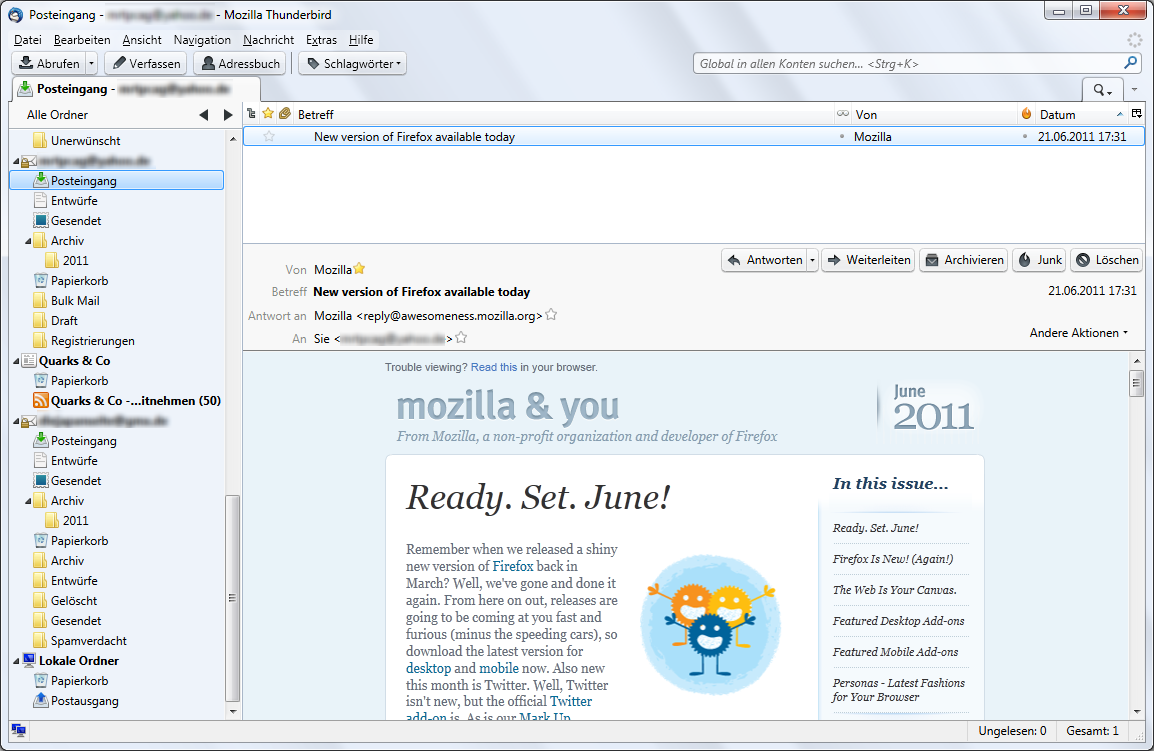
Thunderbird 5.0, the first version under the software's rapid release cycle

On April 4, 2011, Mozilla Messaging was merged into the Mozilla Labs group of the Mozilla Foundation.

Following in the footsteps of Firefox, Thunderbird switched to a rapid release cycle in 2011. Version 4.0 was skipped so as to re-align Thunderbird with Firefox's version 5.0, both released in June 2011. By the end of the year it had reached version 9.0.

On July 6, 2012, a confidential memo from Jb Piacentino, the Thunderbird Managing Director at Mozilla, was leaked and published to TechCrunch. The memo indicated that Mozilla would be moving some of the team off the project and further development of new features would be left up to the community. The memo was slated for release on July 9, 2012. A subsequent article by the Executive Chair of Mozilla, Mitchell Baker, stated Mozilla's decision to make a transition of Thunderbird to a new release and governance model. On July 6, 2012, Mozilla announced the company was dropping the priority of Thunderbird development because the continuous effort to extend Thunderbird's feature set was mostly fruitless. The new development model shifted to Mozilla offering only "Extended Support Releases", which deliver security and maintenance updates, while allowing the community to take over the development of new features.

On November 25, 2014, Kent James of the volunteer-led Thunderbird Council announced on the Thunderbird blog that active contributors to Thunderbird gathered at the Mozilla office in Toronto and discussed the future of the application. They decided that more staff were required working full-time on Thunderbird so that the Thunderbird Team could release a stable and reliable product and make progress on features that had been frequently requested by the community.

On December 1, 2015, Mozilla Executive Chair Mitchell Baker announced in a company-wide memo that Thunderbird development needed to be uncoupled from Firefox. She referred to Thunderbird developers spending large efforts responding to changes to Mozilla technologies, while Firefox was paying a tax to support Thunderbird development. She also said that she does not believe Thunderbird has the potential for "industry-wide impact" that Firefox does. Mozilla remained interested in having a role in Thunderbird, but sought more assistance to help with development. Therefore, at the same time, it was announced that Mozilla Foundation would provide at least a temporary legal and financial home for the Thunderbird project.

=== 2017—present ===
Logo of Thunderbird 2018–2023

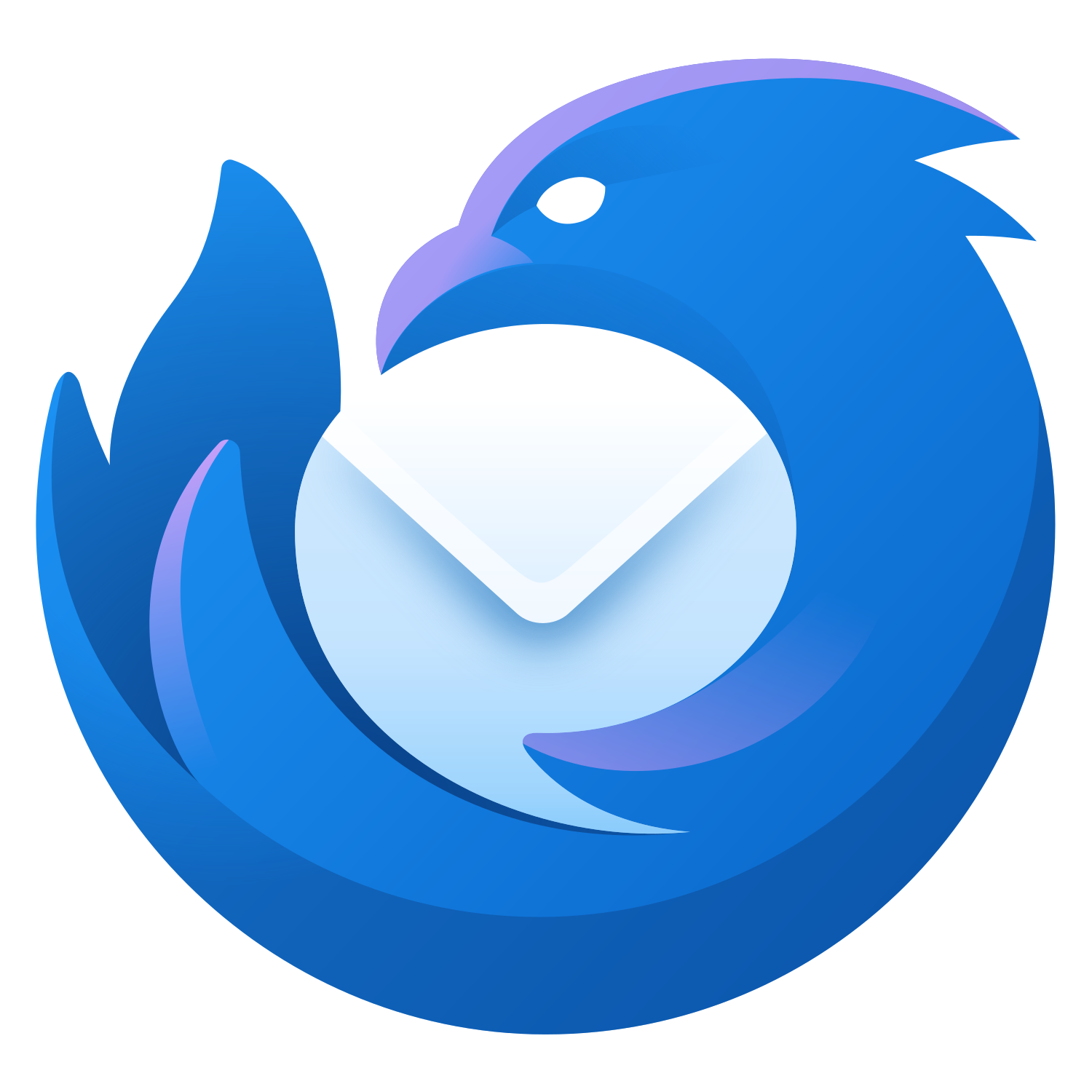
Logo of Thunderbird since 2023

On May 9, 2017, Philipp Kewisch announced that the Mozilla Foundation would continue to serve as the legal and fiscal home for the Thunderbird project, but that Thunderbird would migrate off Mozilla Corporation infrastructure, separating the operational aspects of the project. Mozilla brought Thunderbird back in-house in an announcement on May 9, 2017, and continued to support its development. The Thunderbird development team expanded by adding several new members and overhauled security and the user interface.

The interim/beta versions Thunderbird 57 and 58, released in late 2017, began to make changes influenced by Firefox Quantum, including a new "Photon" user interface. Despite the removal in Firefox Quantum of support for XUL-based legacy add-ons in favor of WebExtensions, the stable/ESR release of Thunderbird 60 in mid-2018 continued to support them, although most would require updates, and it did not support WebExtensions except for Themes. In 2018, work was underway for planned support in Thunderbird 63 of WebExtensions and to continue to "somewhat" support legacy addons, according to Mozilla.

With the release of Thunderbird 68 in August 2019 it now only supports WebExtension addons. Legacy Addons can still be used if a special "legacy mode" is enabled, but even for this, the legacy Addon has to be converted. Alongside the transition, OpenPGP support was integrated directly into Thunderbird as a standard feature, seeking to supplant the Enigmail extension. Mainly for licensing reasons, this is no longer based on GnuPG, but on the RNP library, which has more liberal licensing terms.

On January 28, 2020, the Mozilla Foundation announced that the project would henceforth be operating from a new wholly owned subsidiary, MZLA Technologies Corporation, in order to explore offering products and services that were not previously possible and to collect revenue through partnerships and non-charitable donations.

As of version 78.7.1, Thunderbird will no longer allow installation of addons that use Legacy WebExtensions. Only MailExtensions are now compatible with Thunderbird. MailExtensions are WebExtensions but with "some added features specific to Thunderbird".

Thunderbird 91 features various UI improvements (including a new account setup workflow), Apple silicon support, CardDAV address book support, built-in import and export tools for Thunderbird profiles, the PDF.js PDF viewer, and the ability to encrypt emails to BCC recipients.

On June 13, 2022, it was announced that the Mozilla Thunderbird team would take over development of the Android email client app K-9 Mail, with plans for it to eventually become a mobile version of Thunderbird with synchronisation support.

In November 2024, Thunderbird Mobile became available for download, and in December 2024, iodéOS, an open source Android operating system, began including Thunderbird Mobile as the default email client for some 30+ devices.

=== Releases ===
Thunderbird development releases occur in three stages, called Beta, Earlybird, and Daily, which correspond to Firefox's Beta, Aurora, and Nightly stages. The release dates and Gecko versions are exactly the same as Firefox; for example, Firefox 7 and Thunderbird 7 were both released on September 27, 2011, and were both based on Gecko 7.0.

== Thunderbird Pro ==
On April 4, 2025, the Thunderbird team announced a future suite of paid, cloud-based services under the name "Thunderbird Pro". The announcement positioned the new services as an open-source, privacy-focused ecosystem to compete with integrated platforms like Google Workspace and Microsoft 365. The team clarified that the core Thunderbird email application will remain free of charge and that the Pro services are an optional, separate offering designed to provide features not possible in a client-only application, such as server-side processing and storage.

The stated business model is a subscription-based service to cover infrastructure costs, with plans to introduce a limited free tier once the service is sustainable. The announcement emphasized that all components would be open source and built on open standards to avoid vendor lock-in.

The services announced as part of the Thunderbird Pro suite include:

- Thundermail: An email service, including calendar and contact hosting, intended to provide an ad-free and privacy-respecting alternative to existing providers. The service will offer email addresses at thundermail.com or tb.pro as well as support for custom domains. Thundermail will be built on the open-source software stack Stalwart.
- Thunderbird Appointment: A scheduling tool allowing users to share a link for others to book meetings on their calendar. As of June 9, 2025, the service is in closed beta.
- Thunderbird Send: An end-to-end encrypted file-sharing service for large files. The project is described as a successor to Firefox Send. The source code for send is published on GitHub.
- Thunderbird Assist: An experimental, opt-in feature to provide AI capabilities. Developed in partnership with Flower AI, it is designed to use federated learning for on-device processing where possible and confidential remote compute for privacy-preserving server-side processing.

At the time of the announcement, Appointment was in a closed beta, Send was in alpha, and a waitlist had been opened for the Thundermail beta.
