= Firefox Lockwise =

Password manager by Mozilla

- Developer: Mozilla Corporation
- Release: 21 May 2019; 7 years ago

Final release(s) [±]
- Android: 4.0.3 / 14 December 2020; 5 years ago
- iOS: 1.8.1 / 16 April 2021; 5 years ago
- Written in: Kotlin (for Android), Swift (for iOS), JavaScript (for Firefox add-on)
- Operating system: Android Nougat and later; iOS 11 or later
- Available in: 5 languages
- List of languages English, French, German, Italian, Spanish
- Type: Password manager
- License: MPL-2.0
- Website: lockwise.firefox.com
- Repository: Add-on: lockwise-addon; Android: lockwise-android; iOS: lockwise-ios

Firefox Lockwise (formerly Lockbox) is a deprecated password manager for the Firefox web browser, as well as the mobile operating systems iOS and Android. On desktop, Lockwise was simply part of Firefox, whereas on iOS and Android it was available as a standalone app. If Firefox Sync was activated (with a Firefox account), then Lockwise synced passwords between Firefox installations across devices. It also featured a built-in random password generator. The application and branding have since been "phased out."

== History ==
Developed by Mozilla, it was originally named Firefox Lockbox in 2018. It was renamed "Lockwise" in May 2019. It was introduced for iOS on 10 July 2018 as part of the Test Pilot program. On 26 March 2019, it was released for Android.

On desktop, Lockwise started out as a browser addon. Alphas were released between March and August 2019. Since Firefox version 70, Lockwise has been integrated into the browser (accessible at about:logins), having replaced a basic password manager presented in a popup window.

Mozilla ended support for Firefox Lockwise on December 13, 2021.

As of January 2026, Lockwise is still fully functional on Android to this day.

== See also ==
- List of password managers
