= Mozilla Monitor =

Online data removal service

- Developer: Mozilla
- Type: Internet security
- Launched: September 25, 2018; 8 years ago
- Status: Active
- Pricing model: Freemium
- Website: monitor.mozilla.org

Mozilla Monitor, formerly known as Firefox Monitor, is an online data removal service developed by Mozilla, announced in June 2018, and launched on September 25 of that year.

== Operation ==
Mozilla Monitor informs users if their email address and passwords used have been leaked in data breaches, using the database provided by Have I Been Pwned? (HIBP). Mozilla is also working with HIBP's creator, Troy Hunt. Mozilla Monitor's paid plans offers automatic removals of personal information from data brokers, requesting the removal of personal data. Mozilla Monitor can be accessed through a web interface on all browsers.

== Controversies ==
Mozilla Monitor partners with OneRep to issue data removal requests from online directories and data aggregators. On March 14, 2024, an investigation by Krebs on Security revealed that OneRep's founder had also founded multiple people-search companies in the past. In response, Mozilla responded in a statement to Krebs on Security "We were aware of the past affiliations with the entities named in the article and were assured they had ended prior to our work together. We’re now looking into this further. We will always put the privacy and security of our customers first and will provide updates as needed.” Following up on their statement shortly after, Mozilla's vice president of communications told The Verge that it had ended the partnership with OneRep.

In February 2025, Krebs on Security found that Mozilla was still using and promoting OneRep.
