= Cloud9 IDE =

Online integrated development environment

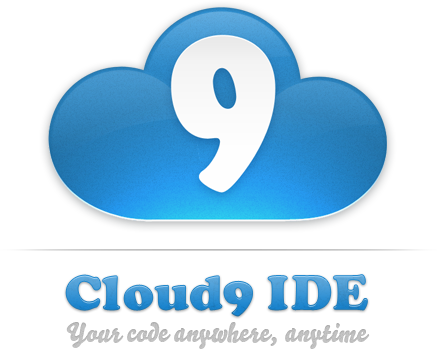
- Developer: Amazon Web Services
- Written in: JavaScript
- Platform: Web
- Type: IDE
- License: v3 - Freeware, Non-commercial License
- Website: c9.io

Cloud9 IDE is an online IDE (integrated development environment), published as open source from version 2.0, until version 3.0. It supports multiple programming languages, including C, C++, PHP, Ruby, Perl, Python, JavaScript with Node.js, and Go. It is written almost entirely in JavaScript, and uses Node.js on the back-end. The editor component uses Ace. Cloud9 was acquired by Amazon in July 2016 and became a part of Amazon Web Services (AWS). The service was closed to new customers in 2024.

== Features ==
Some of the features of an older version included automatic code completion for snippets and identifiers, parenthesis and bracket matching, a debugger, and a gutter where line numbers and errors or warnings would be displayed. Cloud9 IDE also offered syntax highlighting for various languages, such as C#, C/C++, Java, JavaScript, Python, and Ruby. Particularly for JavaScript, it offered real-time language analysis, code reformatting, and refactoring facilities. It was also extensible and customizable, allowing users to change themes, plugins, and key-bindings to make their preferred setup.

== History ==
Cloud9 was founded in 2010 by Rik Arends and Ruben Daniels. It was set up as one of the first software as a service platforms, allowing an IDE in the cloud. The founders raised $5 million in funding, from Accel Partners and product development software company Atlassian Software.

On July 14, 2016, Cloud9 announced that it had been acquired by Amazon.com, and would be integrated into its Amazon Web Services. Amazon later ended new signups to the service on July 25, 2024.

== Usage ==
Cloud9 is the native IDE for the BeagleBone Black single-board computer, which is primarily programmed in an extension of Node.js called Bonescript.

== See also ==
- Online integrated development environment
