= EXtensible Tag Framework =

eXtensible Tag Framework is a framework for implementing new XML elements for Mozilla. The framework allows Mozilla to support a new XML dialect without modifying the Gecko rendering engine. In fact, support of XForms can now be added via the installation of Mozilla extension.
