= Cyberduck =

Free and open-source remote file access software

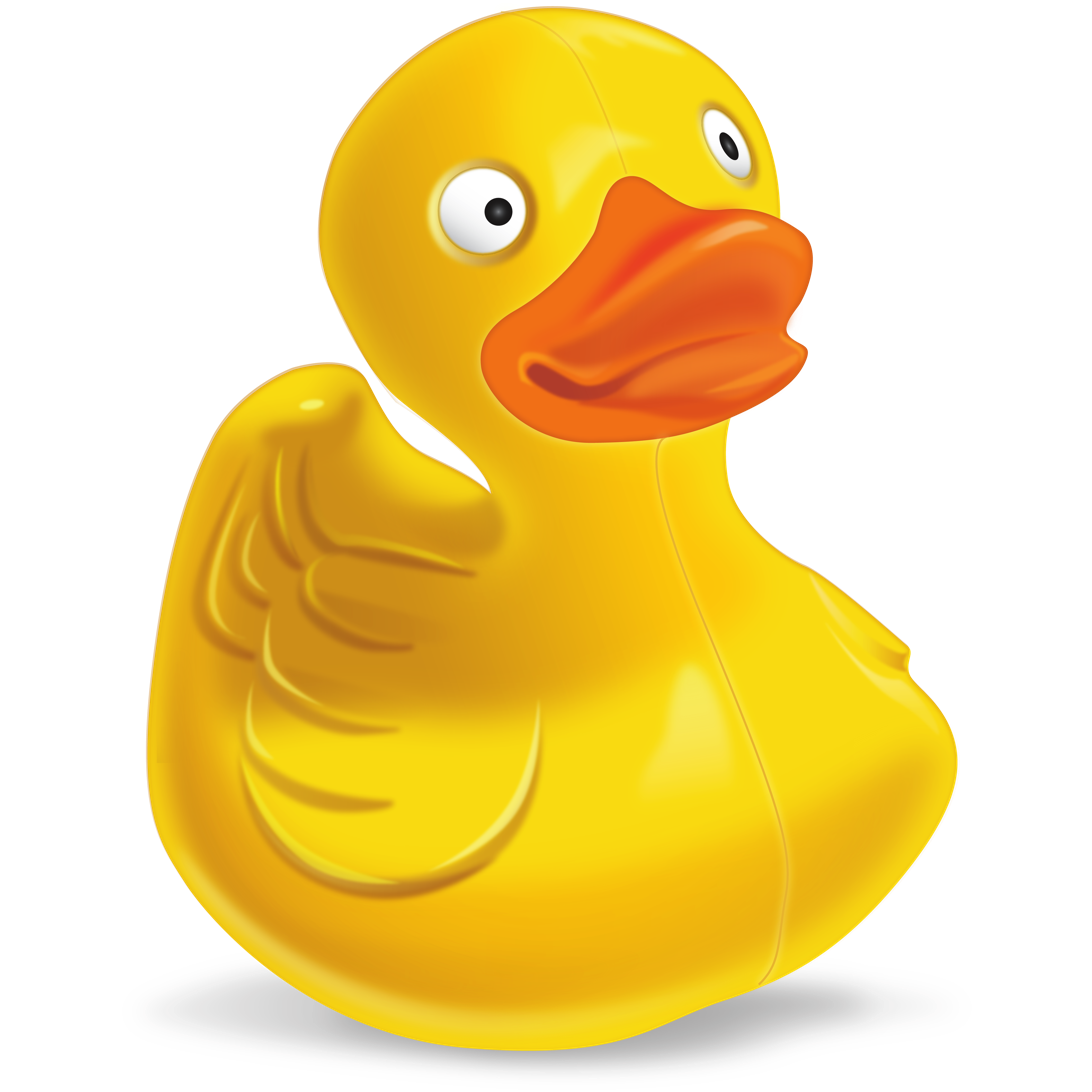

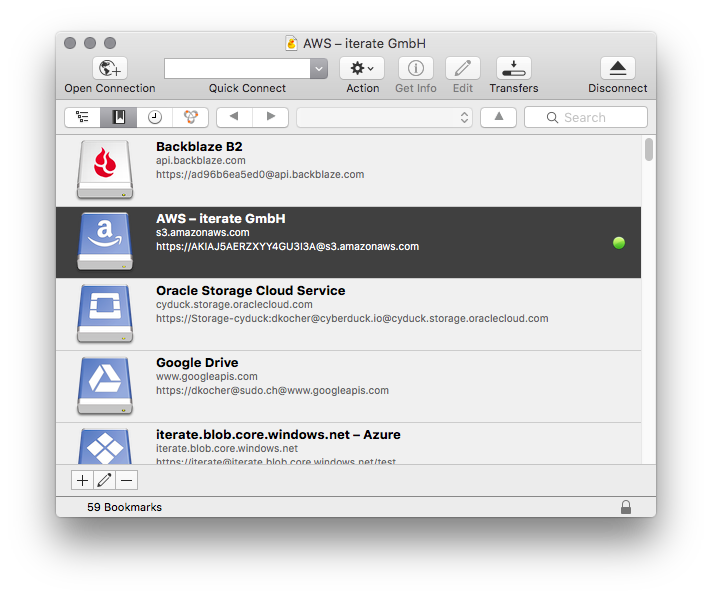
- Cyberduck 6
- Developers: David V. Kocher, Yves Langisch
- Release: April 2002; 24 years ago
- Stable release: 9.4.1 / 3 March 2026
- Written in: Java, C#
- Operating system: macOS, Windows
- Available in: 37 languages
- Type: FTP client
- License: 2017: GPL-3.0-or-later; 2002: GPL-2.0-or-later
- Website: cyberduck.io
- Repository: github.com/iterate-ch/cyberduck.git

Cyberduck is an open-source client for FTP and SFTP, WebDAV, and cloud storage (OpenStack Swift, Amazon S3, Backblaze B2 and Microsoft Azure), available for macOS and Windows (as of version 4.0) licensed under the GPL. Cyberduck is written in Java and C# using the Cocoa user interface framework on macOS and Windows Forms on Windows. It supports FTP/TLS (FTP secured over SSL/TLS), using AUTH TLS as well as directory synchronization. The user interacts with the user interface (GUI), including file transfer by drag and drop and notifications via Growl. It is also able to open some files in external text editors.

Cyberduck includes a bookmark manager and supports Apple's Keychain and Bonjour networking. It supports multiple languages including English, Catalan, Czech, Chinese (Traditional and Simplified), Danish, Dutch, Finnish, French, German, Hebrew, Hungarian, Indonesian, Italian, Japanese, Korean, Norwegian, Polish, Portuguese, Russian, Slovak, Spanish, Swedish, Thai, Turkish, Ukrainian, and Welsh.

== Cyberduck CLI ==
The Cyberduck creator also provides a version for the command-line interface (CLI), called duck, available for Windows, macOS and Linux. It has its own website at duck.sh. The program can be used as FTP and SFTP-client, for operations with different cloud services.

== Monetization Model ==
While the Cyberduck software is free and open-source, it actively asks users for donations upon closing or updating the program, similar to nagware.
