= Lightning (software) =

Free software

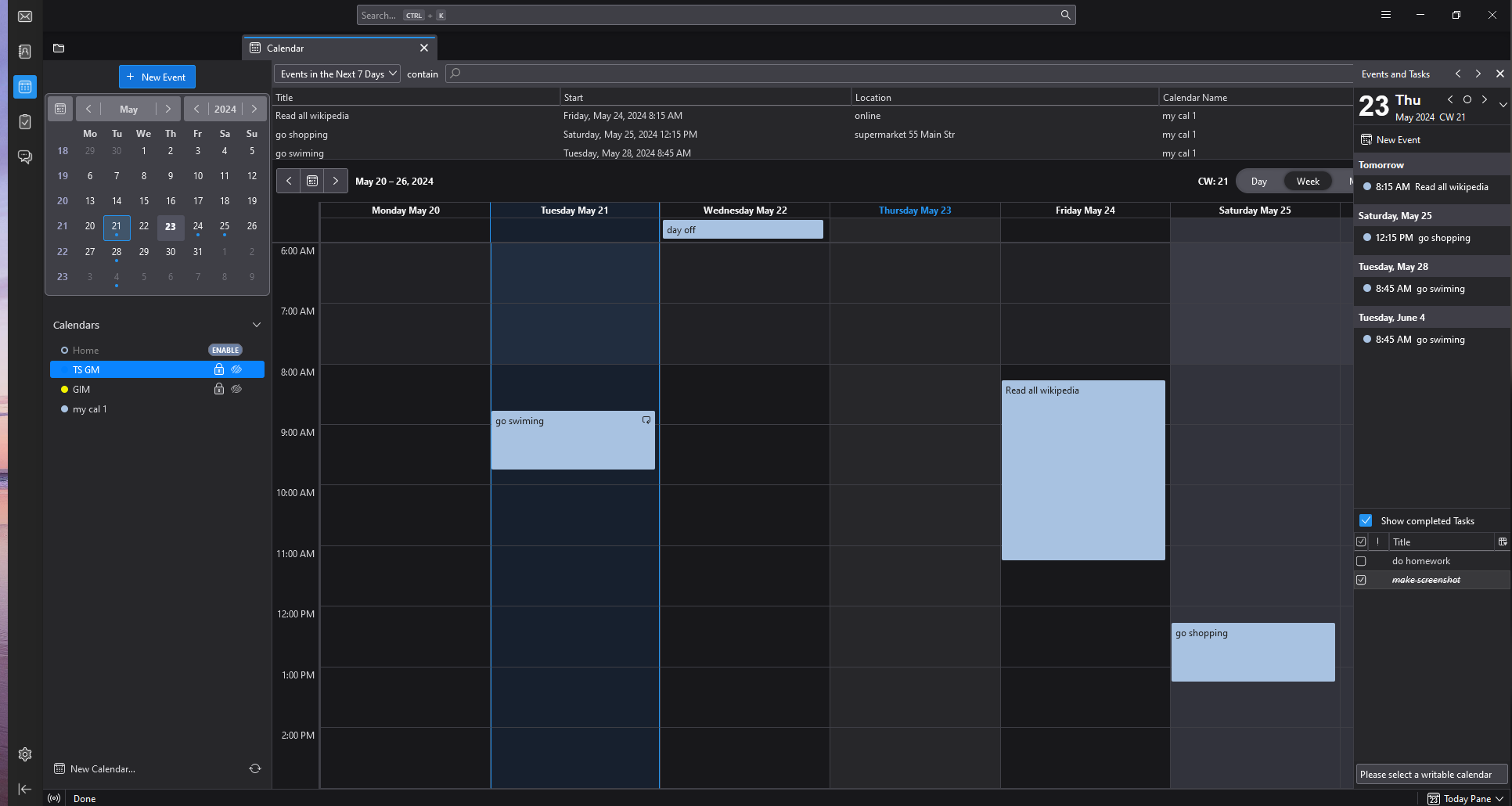
- Lightning running on Thunderbird 115.11.0
- Developer(s): Mozilla Foundation / Mozilla Corporation
- Initial release: 0.1 (March 2006)
- Stable release: 6.2.6.1 (March 25, 2019; 5 years ago) [±]
- Preview release: 6.8b3 (Beta) (March 8, 2019; 6 years ago) [±]
- Written in: C++, XUL, XBL, JavaScript
- Operating system: Linux, Windows, macOS, others
- Available in: 50 languages
- Type: Personal information manager
- License: MPL 2.0
- Website: www.thunderbird.net/calendar/

Lightning is a project from the Mozilla Foundation originally designed as an extension ("add-on") that adds calendar and scheduling functionality to the Mozilla Thunderbird mail client and SeaMonkey internet suite. It superseded the previous Mozilla Sunbird and the older Mozilla Calendar extension. With version 38 of Thunderbird, the Lightning add-on was integrated and preloaded by default; since version 78 of Thunderbird (released 2020), Lightning is part of Thunderbird and no longer an add-on extension. Lightning is compatible with iCalendar calendars.

== History ==
The Lightning project was announced on December 22, 2004, in an effort to integrate Mozilla Sunbird into Mozilla Thunderbird. Sun Microsystems contributed significantly to the Lightning Project to provide users with an alternative free and open-source choice to Microsoft Office by combining OpenOffice.org and Thunderbird with the Lightning Extension. In addition to general bug-fixing, Sun focused on calendar views, team/collaboration features and support for the Sun Java System Calendar Server.

Version 0.9 was the last planned release for Thunderbird 2. A calendar was originally to be fully integrated into Thunderbird 3, but those plans were changed due to concerns with the product's maturity and level of support. Lightning 1.0b2 is compatible with Thunderbird 3.1, Lightning 1.0b5 is compatible with Thunderbird 5 and 6, and Lightning 1.0b7 is compatible with Thunderbird 7.

Lightning 1.0 was released to the public on November 7, 2011. It was released alongside Thunderbird 8.0. Following that, every Thunderbird release has been accompanied by a compatible Lightning point release. Lightning finally started shipping with Thunderbird with version 4.0, on Thunderbird 38.0.1 released in 2015. With the 2020 release of Thunderbird 78, Lightning is now a permanent part of the program.

== See also ==
- List of personal information managers
