= Firefox Send =

File sharing web service (2017–2020)

- Developer: Mozilla
- Release: 12 March 2019; 7 years ago
- Final release: No version number given / 22 May 2021; 5 years ago
- Platform: Web browser
- Type: Secure file sharing
- License: Mozilla Public License 2.0
- Website: send.firefox.com Archived 7 July 2020 at the Wayback Machine
- Repository: Android: github.com/mozilla/send/tree/master/android; iOS: github.com/mozilla/send/tree/master/ios

Firefox Send was a free and open-source end-to-end encrypted file sharing web service developed by Mozilla. It was operational from August 1, 2017 until July 7, 2020.

== Functionality ==
Firefox Send allowed users to upload computer files, including large files up to 2.5 gigabytes, to the Send website, generating links from which the file could be accessed and downloaded. Users could also set expiration dates or maximum number of downloads for the links.

The service was end-to-end encrypted, meaning only the uploader and those who the links were shared with could view the file.

== History ==
On August 1, 2017, Mozilla launched Firefox Send via its Test Pilot program. The developers wanted to experiment with end-to-end encrypted data syncing and this service allowed them to try out encrypting large files, gigabytes in size, as opposed to the megabytes usually synced by browsers.

Firefox Send was launched to the public on March 12, 2019. On July 7, 2020, the service was suspended after the discovery that cybercriminals abused it to spread malware and mount spear phishing attacks. Developers attributed these problems to the absence of any form of authentication and the lack of abuse reporting mechanisms. Developers planned to resume service after implementing mandatory authentication via Firefox Account for file uploading and creating malware reporting mechanisms.

On September 17, 2020, as a part of Mozilla's business and products refocusing plans, the service was shut down permanently, along with Firefox Notes. The shutdown followed employee lay-offs in August that likely included the staff who would have been responsible for implementing abuse prevention and malware reporting mechanisms.

On July 28, 2023, Thunderbird has announced resurrecting Firefox Send as Thunderbird Send.

== See also ==
- RFC 8188 describing "Encrypted Content-Encoding for HTTP", an encoding used by Firefox Send to bundle multiple uploaded encrypted files into one file for storing together on the server.
