= Gary Kovacs =

Canadian businessman (born 1963/1964)

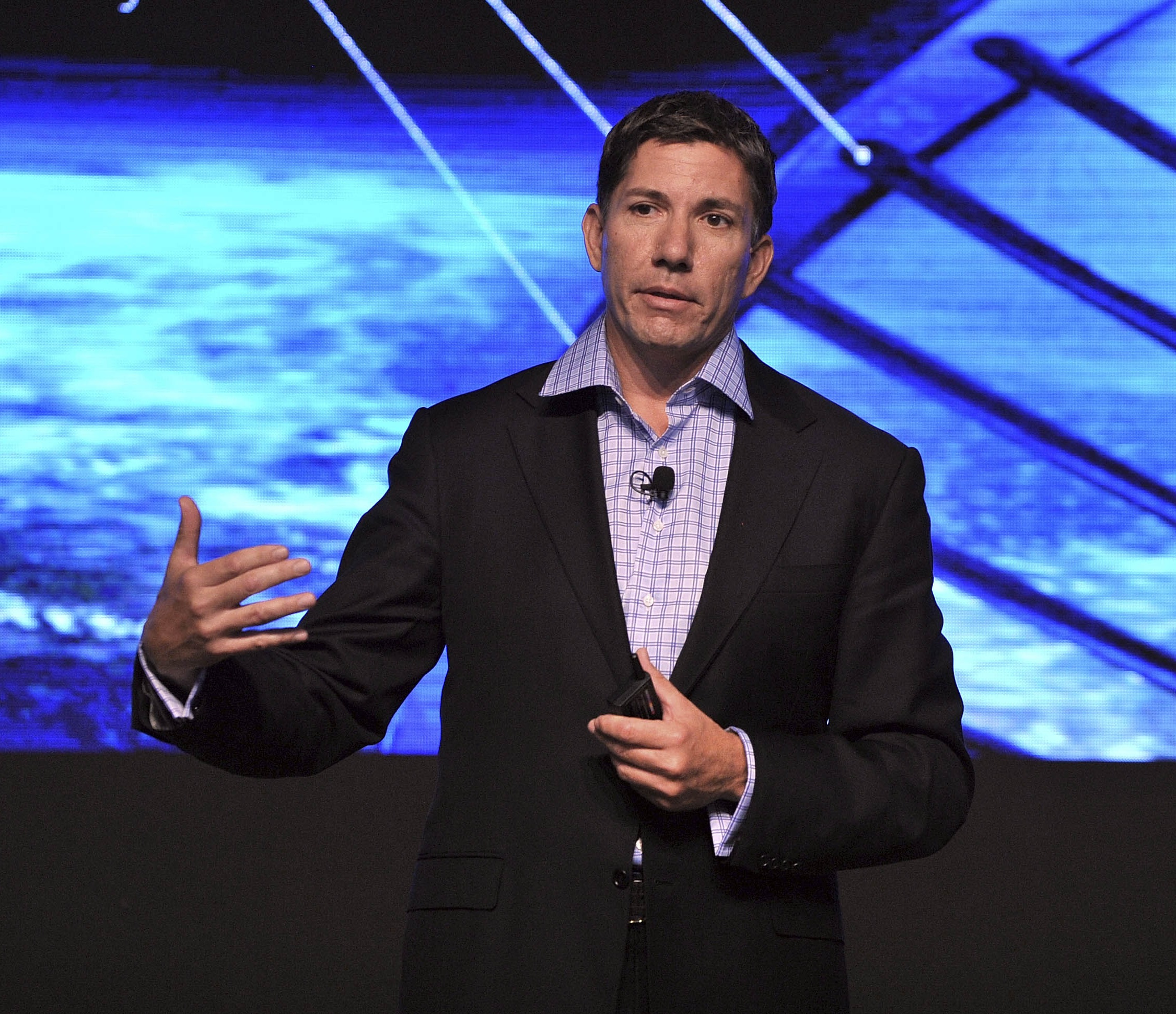
- Kovacs at the 2012 World Economic Forum
- Born: 1963 or 1964 (age 62–63); Toronto, Ontario, Canada
- Education: University of Calgary (BComm) (MBA)
- Occupation: business executive (retired)

Gary Kovacs (born 1963 or 1964) is a Canadian and American technologist and corporate executive. He has been the chief executive officer of Mozilla Corporation, AVG Technologies, and Accela. He has also worked for a number of technology companies in the San Francisco Bay Area including Adobe, SAP, IBM, and Zi Corporation.

== Early life and education ==
Kovacs was born in Toronto, Ontario, Canada, to Ruby (né Kiraly) and Janos (John) Kovacs. Kovacs's father was a Hungarian refugee who fled to Canada in 1956. Kovacs attended the University of Calgary's Haskayne School of Business, earning a BComm in 1990 and an MBA in 1999.

In addition to his undergraduate and graduate business degrees, Kovacs is a certified communications electronics technologist.

== Career ==
Kovacs joined IBM in 1990, where he eventually became Worldwide Program Director for the software division, based in New York. After 10 years at IBM, Kovacs became President of Zi Corporation, a company that pioneered predictive text, among other mobile search and text input solutions.

Kovacs moved to Macromedia in 2003, working as Vice President of Product Marketing. When Adobe acquired Macromedia in 2005, Kovacs became vice president and general manager of product management and marketing for Adobe's mobile and devices division and became to General Manager of the division in 2008. From 2009 to 2010, Kovacs served as Senior Vice President of Markets, Solutions, and Products at Sybase, through its acquisition by SAP.

In 2010, Mozilla the parent organization of the Firefox web browser selected Kovacs to replace former CEO John Lilly. During Kovacs' tenure Mozilla expanded into the mobile market with the launch of Firefox OS, its open mobile operating system. Kovacs previewed Firefox OS at Mobile World Congress 2013, garnering commitments from 18 major worldwide mobile operators. However, Firefox OS proved to be a failure and was discontinued by Mozilla after Kovacs's departure.

In 2012, he gave a TED talk, "Tracking the Trackers", explores issues of Internet privacy in an increasingly connected world. At the World Economic Forum Annual Meeting of the New Champions in 2012, he presented on strategies for creating a resilient cyber economy amid economic, security, and privacy obstacles. He was a keynote speaker at the Mobile World Congress 2013.

In April 2013 Mozilla announced that he would step down as CEO of the corporation later that year and until March 2014 he was part of Mozilla's board of directors.

On July 30, 2013, Kovacs joined AVG Technologies as CEO. In September 2016, AVG Technologies was acquired by Avast Software for US$1.3B. Kovacs employment with AVG Technologies was terminated in December 2016 In April 2017, Kovacs filed a complaint in the San Francisco County Superior Court against AVG Technologies USA Inc. and Does 1-50 alleging breach of contract, wrongful termination and other counts. The suit states the defendants fabricated a sham reason to terminate the plaintiff's employment and terminated him in December 2016, allegedly to avoid paying him his severance, bonus and other amounts due to him.

Kovacs served as the CEO of Accela, an American private government technology company, from December 2018 to January 2024.

== Personal life ==
Raised by Hungarian parents in Toronto, Kovacs began experimenting with technology at a young age. Though grateful for the opportunities and education provided by his native Canada, his interest in innovation drew him to the San Francisco Bay Area.

Preceded by John Lilly	CEO of Mozilla Corporation; 8 November 2010 – March 2014	Succeeded by Brendan Eich
