= Mozilla Manifesto =

Guiding principles of the Mozilla Foundation

The current Mozilla logo

The Mozilla Manifesto lays out the guiding principles of the Mozilla Foundation, the non-profit that leads the open-source Mozilla project best-known for its Firefox web browser. Penned in 2007 by Mitchell Baker, with adjustments in 2018, it promotes free software, universal access to the internet, and interoperable technologies, and emphasizes values of privacy, openness, and a belief in the ability of the internet to enrich the lives of people.

== History ==
The manifesto, adapted from principles Mozilla had held since it was founded in 1998, was written by Mitchell Baker and originally published in 2007. As a result of the subsequent evolution of the internet, which led Baker to believe that "the power of the internet [has been] used to magnify divisiveness, incite violence, promote hatred, and intentionally manipulate fact and reality", the manifesto was updated on the 20th anniversary of the founding of Mozilla in 2018 to add values of human dignity, tolerance, and civil discourse.

== Content ==
The manifesto outlines the guiding principles of the Mozilla Foundation and includes a pledge for how it will further those principles. It also asserts Mozilla's commitment to the internet, saying: "The open, global internet is the most powerful communication and collaboration resource we have ever seen. It embodies some of our deepest hopes for human progress."

=== Principles ===
The manifesto lays out 10 key principles:

1. The internet is an integral part of modern life—a key component in education, communication, collaboration, business, entertainment and society as a whole.
2. The internet is a global public resource that must remain open and accessible.
3. The internet must enrich the lives of individual human beings.
4. Individuals’ security and privacy on the internet are fundamental and must not be treated as optional.
5. Individuals must have the ability to shape the internet and their own experiences on it.
6. The effectiveness of the internet as a public resource depends upon interoperability (protocols, data formats, content), innovation and decentralized participation worldwide.
7. Free and open source software promotes the development of the internet as a public resource.
8. Transparent community-based processes promote participation, accountability and trust.
9. Commercial involvement in the development of the internet brings many benefits; a balance between commercial profit and public benefit is critical.
10. Magnifying the public benefit aspects of the internet is an important goal, worthy of time, attention and commitment.

=== Pledge ===
The manifesto also includes a pledge outlining Mozilla's commitments. These are to:

- Build and enable open-source technologies and communities that support the Manifesto’s principles;
- Build and deliver great consumer products that support the Manifesto’s principles;
- Use the Mozilla assets (intellectual property such as copyrights and trademarks, infrastructure, funds, and reputation) to keep the Internet an open platform;
- Promote models for creating economic value for the public benefit; and
- Promote the Mozilla Manifesto principles in public discourse and within the Internet industry.

== See also ==
- Don't be evil
- Right to Internet access
- Digital rights
- Internet activism
