= John Lilly (computer scientist) =

American venture capitalist

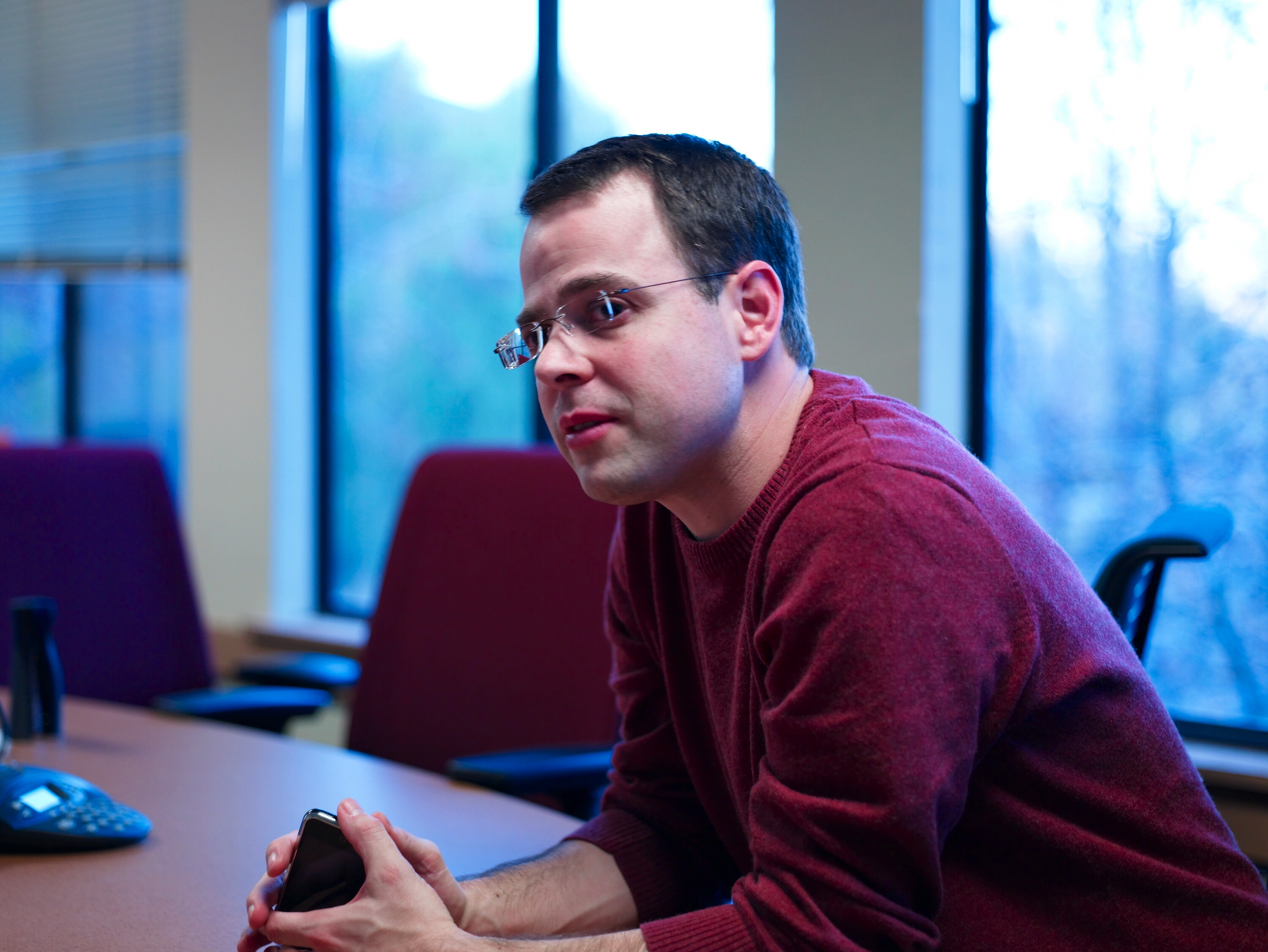
- Occupations: Board Chair, Code for America; Lecturer in Management, Stanford University
- Known for: Mozilla Corp. CEO (2008–2010); Venture capitalism

John Lilly is a venture capitalist and former CEO of Mozilla. He currently serves on the board of directors of the Open Source Applications Foundation and Code for America. He earned his B.S. in computer systems engineering and M.S. in computer science from Stanford University.

== Career ==
=== Reactivity ===
Lilly co-founded and served the CTO for Reactivity, a start-up focused on consulting on technically difficult websites and incubating new companies. Cisco Systems bought Reactivity in 2007 for $135 million.

=== Mozilla ===
Lilly was the chief executive officer of the Mozilla Corporation from 2008 to 2010. The corporation, a subsidiary of the Mozilla Foundation, coordinates development of open-source Mozilla Internet applications, including the Firefox web browser. Lilly, previously Mozilla's chief operating officer, succeeded Mitchell Baker as CEO in January 2008.

In May 2010, Lilly announced he would step down as CEO. Lilly was succeeded by Gary Kovacs on November 8, 2010. Lilly left Mozilla's board of directors in March 2014, reportedly over the appointment of Brendan Eich as CEO.

=== Venture capital ===
Lilly joined the venture capital firm Greylock Partners as a partner in 2011. His investments include Instagram, Dropbox, Tumblr, Quip, and MessageMe. Lilly left the firm in January 2019 to dedicate himself more to activism, explaining "it’s crystal clear that 2019 & 2020 are crucially important years — certainly the most important time in a generation, but maybe much longer than that." Lilly has been a board member of Figma since December 2014, representing Greylock. He has been an independent board member of Duolingo since 2021.

Preceded by Mitchell Baker	CEO of Mozilla Corporation; 7 January 2008 – 2010	Succeeded by Gary Kovacs
