= Brendan Eich =

American programmer and tech executive (born 1961)

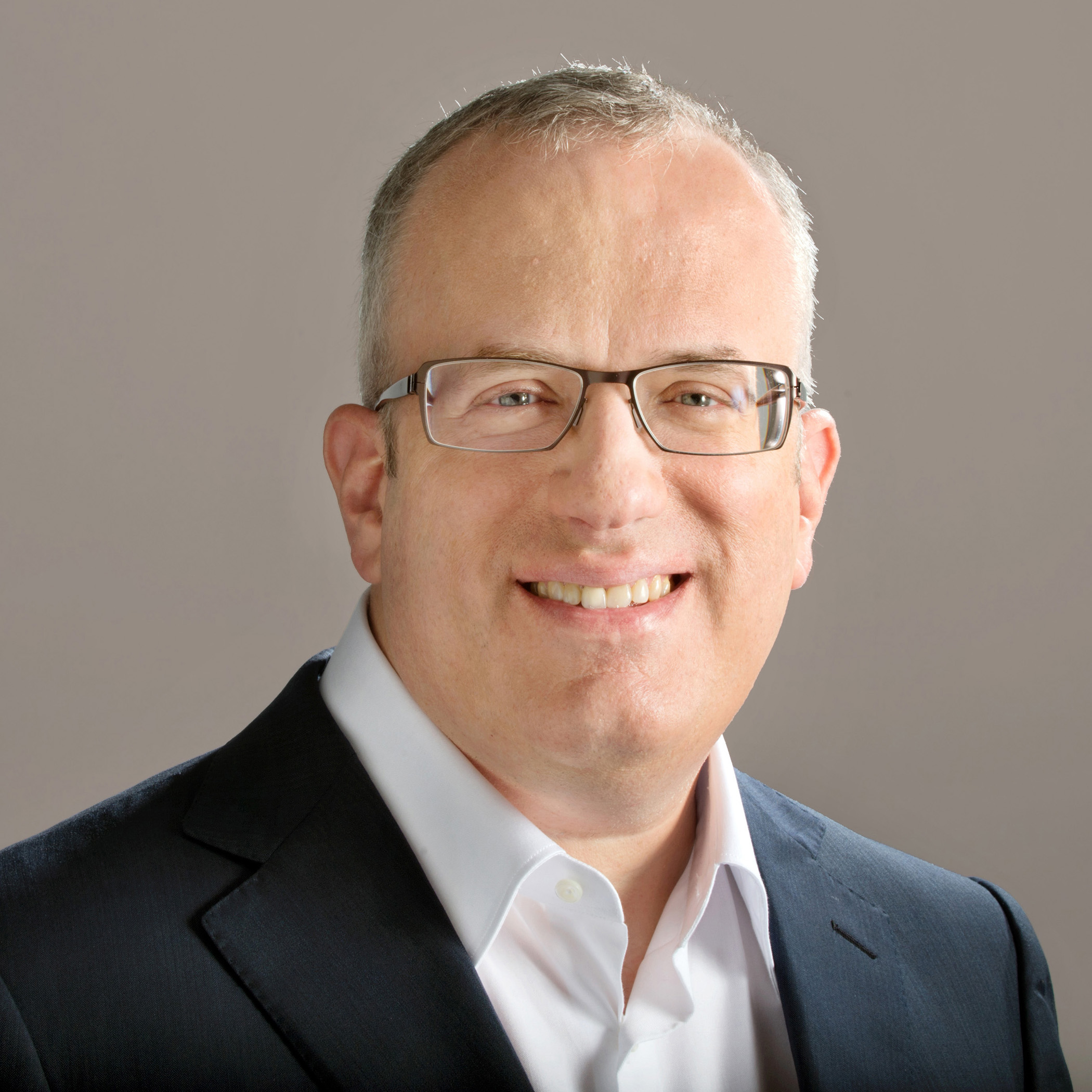
- Eich in 2012
- Born: July 4, 1961 (age 65); Pittsburgh, Pennsylvania, US
- Education: Santa Clara University (BS); University of Illinois Urbana-Champaign (MS)
- Known for: Creation of JavaScript and co-founder of Mozilla project, Mozilla Foundation, Mozilla Corporation, and Brave
- Website: brendaneich.com

Brendan Eich (/ˈaɪk/ EYEK; born July 4, 1961) is an American computer programmer and technology executive. He created the JavaScript programming language and co-founded the Mozilla project, the Mozilla Foundation, and the Mozilla Corporation. He served as the Mozilla Corporation's chief technical officer before he was appointed chief executive officer, but resigned shortly after his appointment due to pressure over his opposition to same-sex marriage. He subsequently became the cofounder and CEO of Brave browser.

== Early life ==
Eich grew up in Pittsburgh; Gaithersburg, Maryland; and Palo Alto, where he attended Ellwood P. Cubberley High School, graduating in the class of 1979. He received his bachelor's degree in mathematics and computer science at Santa Clara University, and he received his master's degree in 1985 from the University of Illinois Urbana-Champaign. Eich is Roman Catholic, and has Irish-German ancestry.

He began his career at Silicon Graphics, working for seven years on operating system and network code.

== Career ==
=== Netscape ===
Eich started work at Netscape Communications Corporation in April 1995. He originally joined intending to put Scheme "in the browser", but his Netscape managers insisted that the language's syntax resemble that of Java. As a result, Eich devised a language that had much of the functionality of Scheme, the object-orientation of Self, and the syntax of Java. He completed the first version in ten days in order to accommodate the Navigator 2.0 Beta release schedule. At first the language was called Mocha, but it was renamed LiveScript in September 1995 and finally – in a joint announcement with Sun Microsystems – it was named JavaScript in December. Simultaneously, he designed the first SpiderMonkey engine to execute the new language in the Navigator browser.

When Mozilla inherited the Netscape base code in 1998, it included this engine, which was written in the C language. It was then changed in JavaScript 1.5 to comply with the ECMA-262 standard. Eich continued to oversee the development of SpiderMonkey, the specific implementation of JavaScript in Navigator.

=== Mozilla ===
In early 1998, Eich co-founded the free and open-source software project Mozilla with Jamie Zawinski and others, creating the mozilla.org website, which was meant to manage open-source contributions to the Netscape source code. He served as Mozilla's chief architect. AOL bought Netscape in 1999. After AOL shut down the Netscape browser unit in July 2003, Eich helped spin out the Mozilla Foundation.

In August 2005, after serving as a lead technologist and as a member of the board of directors of the Mozilla Foundation, Eich became chief technical officer (CTO) of the newly founded Mozilla Corporation, meant to be the Mozilla Foundation's for-profit arm. Eich continued to "own" the Mozilla SpiderMonkey module, its JavaScript engine, until he passed the ownership of it to Dave Mandelin in 2011.

==== Appointment to CEO and resignation ====
On March 24, 2014, Mozilla decided to appoint Eich as CEO of Mozilla Corporation. The appointment triggered widespread criticism due to Eich's past political donations – specifically, a 2008 donation of $1,000 to California Proposition 8, which called for the banning of same-sex marriage in California, and donations in the amount of $2,100 to Proposition 8 supporter Tom McClintock between 2008 and 2010. The Wall Street Journal initially reported that, in protest against his coming appointment, half of Mozilla's board (Gary Kovacs, John Lilly, and Ellen Siminoff) stepped down, leaving Mitchell Baker, Reid Hoffman, and Katharina Borchert. CNET later reported that of the three board members who had gone, only Lilly left due to Eich's appointment. Lilly told The New York Times, "I left rather than appoint him", and declined to elaborate further.

On March 26, 2014, Eich expressed "sorrow for causing pain" and pledged to "work with LGBT communities and allies" at Mozilla. This led to an online campaign against Eich's status as CEO of Mozilla, with online dating site OkCupid automatically displaying a message to Firefox users with information about Eich's donation, and suggesting that users switch to a different browser (although giving them a link to continue with Firefox). CREDO Mobile collected more than 50,000 signatures demanding that Eich resign.

After 11 days as CEO, Eich resigned on April 3, 2014, and left Mozilla after public outrage. In his personal blog, he posted, "under the present circumstances, I cannot be an effective leader". Mozilla made a press release alleging that board members tried to get Eich to stay in the company in a different role, but that he had chosen to sever ties.

=== Brave Software ===
Eich is the co-founder and CEO of Brave Software, a Web browser platform company that raised $2.5 million in early funding from angel investors like Founders Fund, Foundation Capital, and Digital Currency Group. In January 2016, the company released developer versions of its open-source, Chromium-based Brave Web Browser, which blocks advertisements and trackers.

At Brave Software, Eich co-created the Basic Attention Token (BAT), a cryptocurrency designed for use in the Brave browser. BAT launched its initial coin offering on May 31, 2017, and raised $35 million.

In 2020, The New York Times reported that Eich's comments about "the policy and science related to the coronavirus" on Twitter caused a backlash within the browser's user base, commenting that this echoed the criticism that led to his resignation from Mozilla.

Preceded by Gary Kovacs	CEO of Mozilla Corporation; March 24, 2014 – April 3, 2014	Succeeded by Chris Beard
