= University of Edinburgh Business School =

Business school in Edinburgh, Scotland

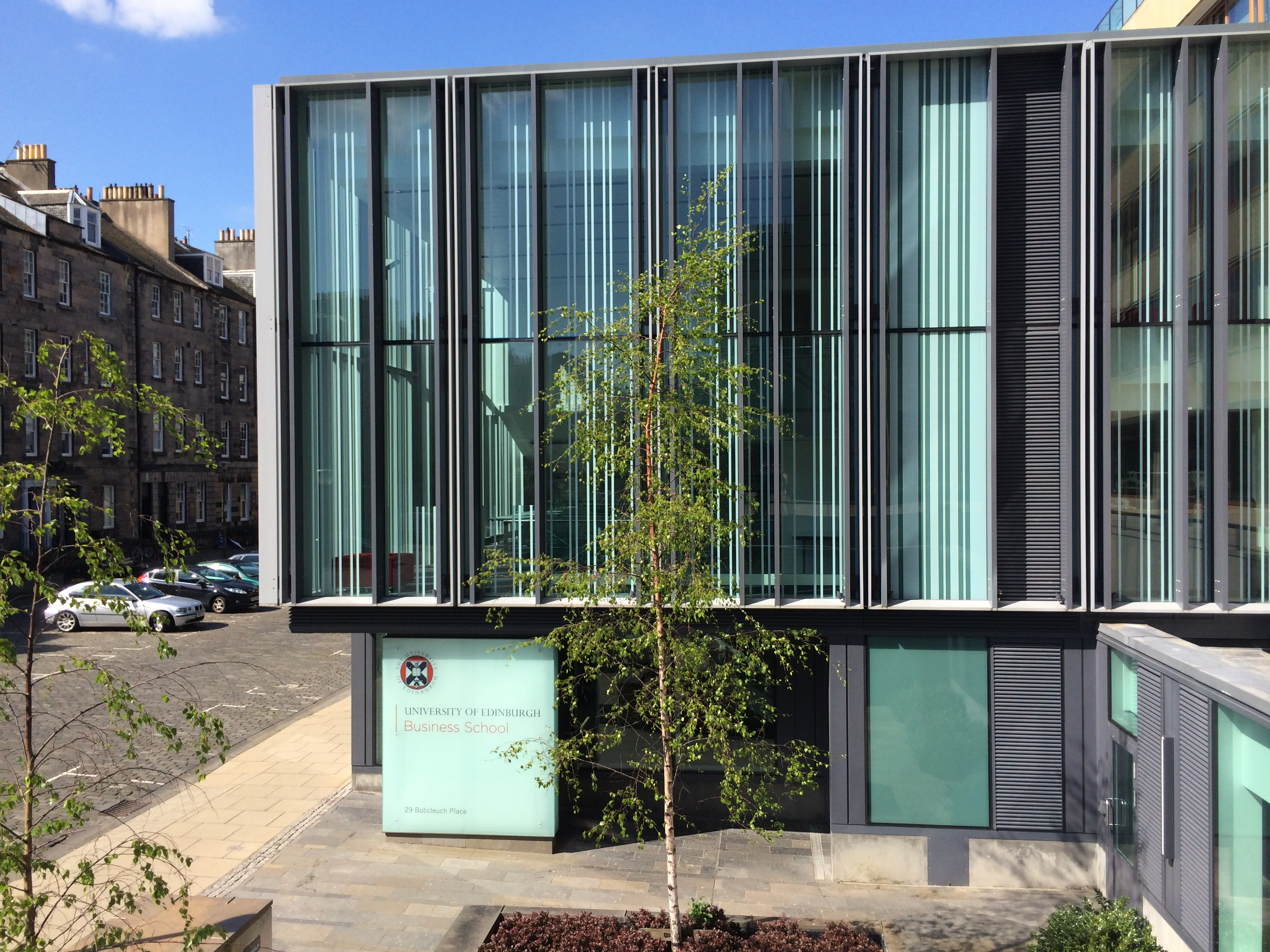
- Main entrance
- Type: Public business school
- Established: 1919; 2008 – as UEBS
- Affiliations: AMBA, EQUIS, AACSB, Triple accreditation
- Head of School: Gavin Jack
- Faculty: ca 140
- Location: Edinburgh, Scotland, United Kingdom; 55°56′44.86″N 3°11′15.78″W
- Campus: Urban
- Website: www.business-school.ed.ac.uk

The University of Edinburgh Business School (abbreviated as UEBS) is the business school within the College of Arts, Humanities and Social Sciences at the University of Edinburgh in Scotland.

The university has offered business education since 1919, and the MBA degree since 1980. The business school is tied to the University of Edinburgh, which received its royal charter in 1582.

== Research and Teaching ==
UEBS offers a range of degree programmes, including:

- Undergraduate
- Masters
- MBA (full time, part-time Executive, online)
- PhD
- Executive Education

At UEBS, numerous research centres and networks have been established. The research carried out falls within six subject groupings:

- Accounting and Finance
- Entrepreneurship and Innovation
- Management Science and Business Economics
- Marketing
- Organisation Studies
- Strategy

== Accreditation and ranking ==
The University of Edinburgh Business School is accredited by the Association to Advance Collegiate Schools of Business, the EFMD Quality Improvement System, and the Association of MBAs.

Rankings:

- 15th in the 2024 QS Sustainability Rankings (3rd in the UK)
- 26th in the 2023 Corporate Knights Better World MBA (7th in the UK)
- 22nd in the 2024 QS World University Rankings (5th in the UK)
- 43rd in the 2023 FT Finance MSc world rankings (8th in the UK)
- 64th in the 2024 QS Global MBA rankings
- 78th in the 2023 FT Management MSc world rankings (5th in the UK)

Programme Accreditations:

- CFA Institute
- Chartered Banker
- CIPD
- CIMA
- ACCA

== Alumni ==
Many alumni participate in mentoring, panel sessions, and speaker opportunities. Over 40 alumni are members of the Alumni Industry Insights, which supports teaching and professional skills development activities.

Notable alumni include:

- George Mackintosh (BCom 1979), Serial Entrepreneur (Eggplant, Papple Steading)
- Judy Murray, tennis coach (MBA 1981)
- David Carnegie, 4th Duke of Fife (MBA 1990)
- Birna Einarsdottir (MBA 1993), CEO, Íslandsbanki
- Garry Wilson (BCom 1994), CEO, easyJet Holidays
- Keith Anderson (MBA 1996), CEO, Scottish Power
- Alan Jope, CEO of Unilever (BCom 2000)
- Susie Wolff, Managing Director of F1 Academy (Attended, 2001)
- Chris Beard, former CEO of Mozilla (MBA 2004)
- Kavi Thakrar (MA(Hons) 2004), Co-Founder, Dishoom
- Chearyp Sokoni (MBA 2006), CFO, IDC Zambia
- Renata Pimenta Scofield (MSc 2011), Global Senior Director, Environmental Stewardship, GSK
- Nurkholisoh Ibnu Aman (PhD 2026), Vice Minister of Finance, Indonesia

== Tartan ==
- The University of Edinburgh Business School tartan is registered under the Scottish Register of Tartans, STA ref: 6107.

== See also ==
- List of business schools in Europe
