= Christopher Blizzard =

American computer engineer (born 1973)

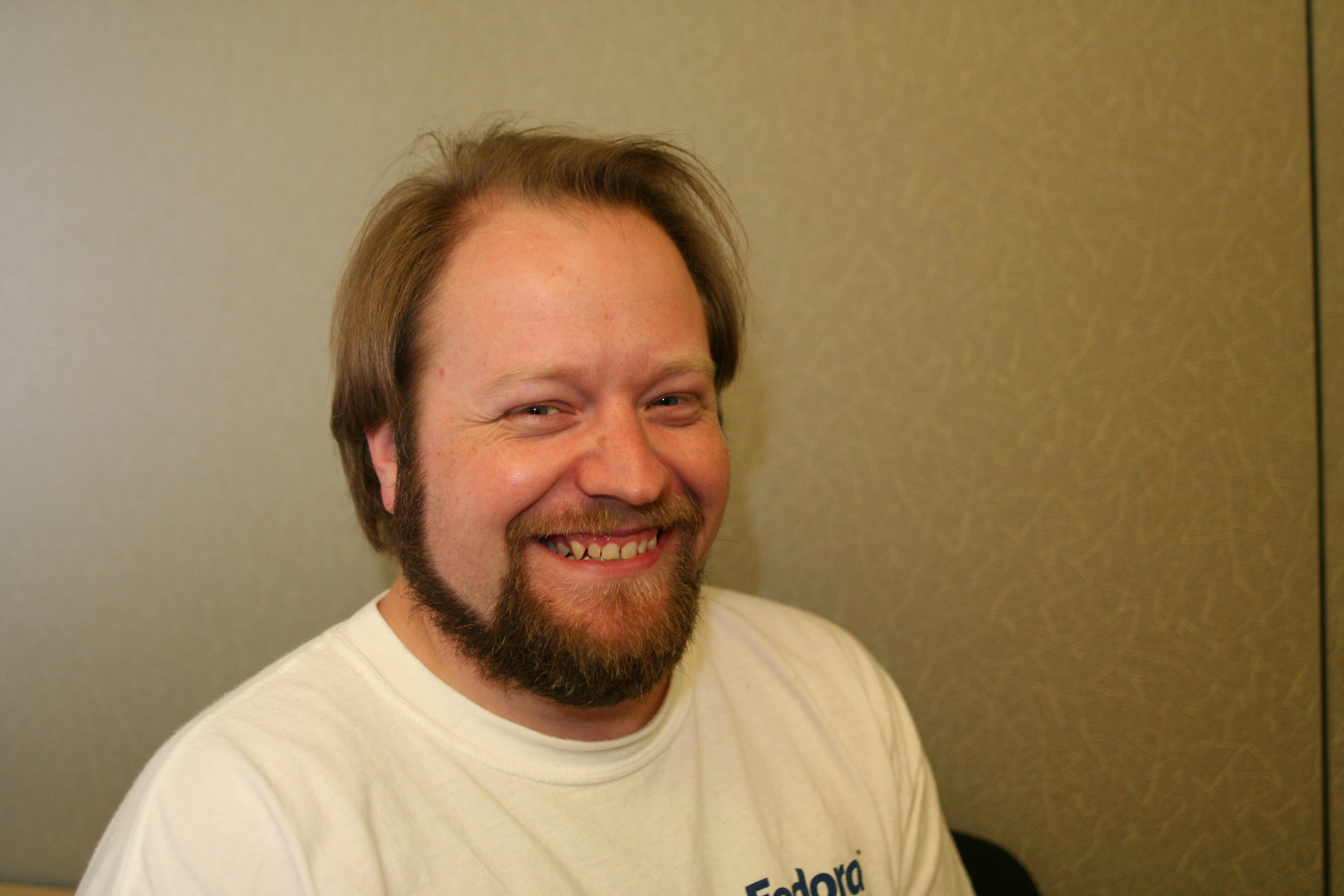
- Christopher Blizzard
- Born: 1973 (age 52–53)
- Occupation: computer engineer

Christopher Blizzard (born 1973) is an American open-source software advocate best known for his early contributions to the Mozilla project. He joined the Mozilla effort in 1998, shortly after its launch as a spin-off of Netscape, initially hosting source-code download mirrors and assisting with Linux ports. He went on to work as a systems engineer and open-source developer at Red Hat, where he helped maintain the redhat.com website and contributed to the Mozilla 1.0 release effort.

Blizzard later served on the Mozilla Corporation's Board of Directors and became the company's Director of Developer Relations and, subsequently, Director of Web Platform, where he worked on implementations of HTML5 standards. He left Mozilla in 2012.

Formerly, he worked as an Open Source Evangelist at the Mozilla Corporation and has contributed to other open source projects, including Red Hat and One Laptop Per Child.

Prior to his position as Open Source Evangelist he was the Software Team Lead for the One Laptop Per Child project at Red Hat and sat on the Mozilla Corporation Board of Directors. Before joining the One Laptop Per Child project he was a systems engineer and Open Source software developer working at Red Hat.

== One Laptop Per Child ==
Blizzard was the OLPC Software Team Lead through Red Hat. He helped to develop the project's modified version of Fedora Core Linux. He handled all integration and community work with the OLPC project and unveiled the laptop in a video on Friday, June 2, 2006. Chris was also involved with the development of the OLPC's Sugar interface.
