= Laura Chambers =

Technology executive

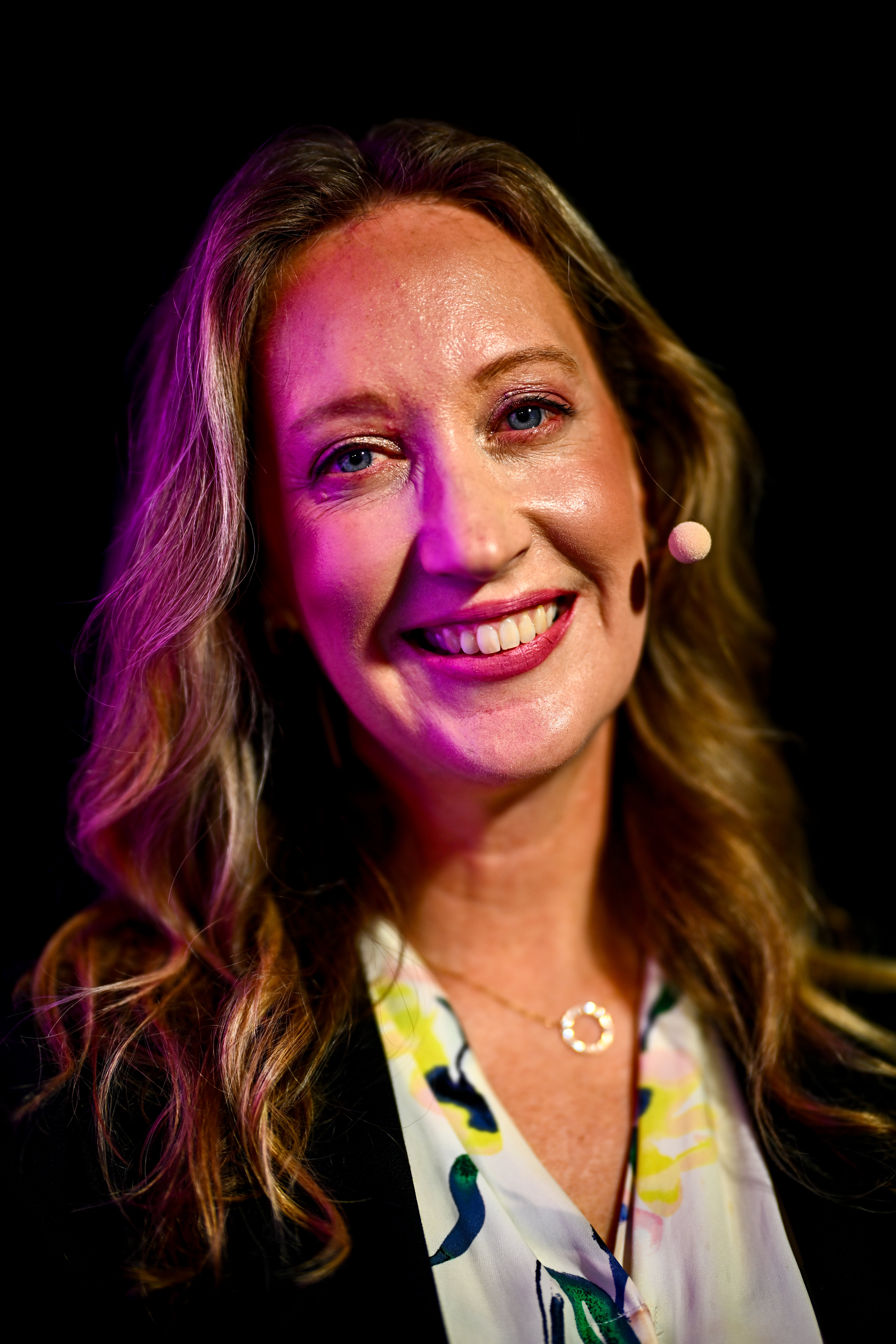
- Laura Chambers in 2025
- Born: Australia
- Education: University of Melbourne (BA); Stanford University (MBA)

Laura Chambers is a member of the board of directors of Mozilla Corporation. She served as the interim chief executive officer of Mozilla from February 2024 to December 2025.

Chambers grew up in a small town in Australia. She earned a bachelor's degree in philosophy from the University of Melbourne. After graduation, she worked as a consultant at McKinsey & Company.

Following her work at McKinsey, Chambers moved to the United States to attend Stanford University, earning a Master of Business Administration in 2005. She went on to work at eBay for 13 years, followed by PayPal, Skype, and Airbnb.

In 2020, Chambers became the CEO of Willow Innovations, a wearable breast pump company headquartered in Mountain View, California.

In 2021, Chambers joined the Mozilla Corporation's board of directors. On February 8, 2024, she replaced Mitchell Baker as interim CEO of Mozilla.

At the time of her interim appointment, Chambers stated that she would not be seeking a permanent position as CEO, as she planned to return to Australia later in 2024 for family reasons. In December 2025, Anthony Enzor-DeMeo succeeded her as CEO, and Chambers returned to serving on Mozilla's board of directors.

Chambers lives with her family in Melbourne. She has three children.
