= Mozilla Persona =

Multibrowser website authentication mechanism prototyped by Mozilla

- Developer: Mozilla Foundation
- Release: July 2011
- Written in: JavaScript
- Operating system: Cross-platform
- Available in: 51 languages
- Type: Authentication
- License: MPL
- Website: developer.mozilla.org/en-US/Persona
- Repository: github.com/mozilla/persona

Mozilla Persona is an obsolete standard for decentralized authentication infrastructure for the Web. Built upon the new BrowserID protocol prototyped by Mozilla and standardized by IETF, the initiative was originally launched in July 2011 under the BrowserID name and later rebranded Mozilla Persona. After failing to achieve traction, Mozilla announced in January 2016 plans to decommission Mozilla-operated services including its identity bridge by the end of the year.

== History and motivations ==
Persona was launched in July 2011 sharing some of the goals of similar authentication systems like OpenID or Facebook Connect, but differing in several ways:

- BrowserID uses email addresses as identifiers
- BrowserID is focused on privacy
- BrowserID is intended to be fully integrated in the browser (relying heavily on JavaScript).

The privacy goal was based upon the principle that the identity provider should not need to know which website the user is identifying on. It was first released in July 2011 and fully deployed by Mozilla on its own websites in January 2012.

In March 2014, Mozilla indicated it was dropping full-time developers from Persona and moving the project to community ownership. Mozilla indicated, however, that it had no plans to decommission Persona and would maintain some level of involvement such as in maintenance and reviewing pull requests.

Persona services are shut down since November 30, 2016.

== Principles and implementation ==
Persona was inspired by the VerifiedEmailProtocol which is now known as the BrowserID protocol. It uses any user email address to identify its owner. This protocol involves the browser, an identity provider, and any compliant website.

=== The browser, the provider and the website ===
The browser stores a list of user verified email addresses (certificates issued by the identity providers), and demonstrates the user's ownership of the addresses to the website using cryptographic proof.

The certificates must be renewed every 24 hours by logging into the identity provider (which will usually mean entering the email and a password in a Web form on the identity provider's site). Once done, they will be usable for authenticating to websites with the same browser for the rest of the day, without entering passwords again (single sign-on).

The decentralization aspects of the protocol reside in the theoretical support of any identity provider service, while in practice it seems to rely mainly on Mozilla's servers currently (which may in turn delegate email address verification, see identity bridging below). However, even if the protocol heavily relies on a central identity provider, this central actor only knows when browsers renew certificates, and cannot in principle monitor where the certificates will be used.

=== Identity bridging ===
Mozilla announced "identity bridging" support for Persona in July 2013. As they describe on their blog:

"Traditionally ... Mozilla would send you an email and ask you to click on the confirmation link it contained. With Identity Bridging, Persona learned a new trick; instead of sending confirmation emails, Persona can ask you to verify your identity via your email provider’s existing OpenID or OAuth gateway."

This announcement included support for existing users of the Yahoo Mail service. In August 2013, Mozilla announced support for Identity Bridging with all Gmail accounts. They wrote in this additional announcement that "combined with our Identity Bridge for Yahoo, Persona now natively supports more than 700,000,000 active email users. That covers roughly 60–80% of people on most North American websites."

== Deployment ==
Persona relies heavily on the JavaScript client-side program running in the user's browser, making it widely usable.

Support of authentication to Web applications via Persona can be implemented by CMSs such as Drupal, Serendipity, WordPress, Tiki, or SPIP. There is also support for Persona in the Phonegap platform (used for compiling HTML5 apps into mobile apps). Mozilla provides its own Persona server at persona.org. It is also possible to set up your own Persona identity provider, providing federated identity.

Notable sites implementing Persona include Ting, The Times Crossword, and Voost.

== See also ==
- OpenID
- WebID, a set of proposed standards for identity, identification, and authentication on HTTP based networks.
