= Chris Beard (executive) =

Canadian business leader

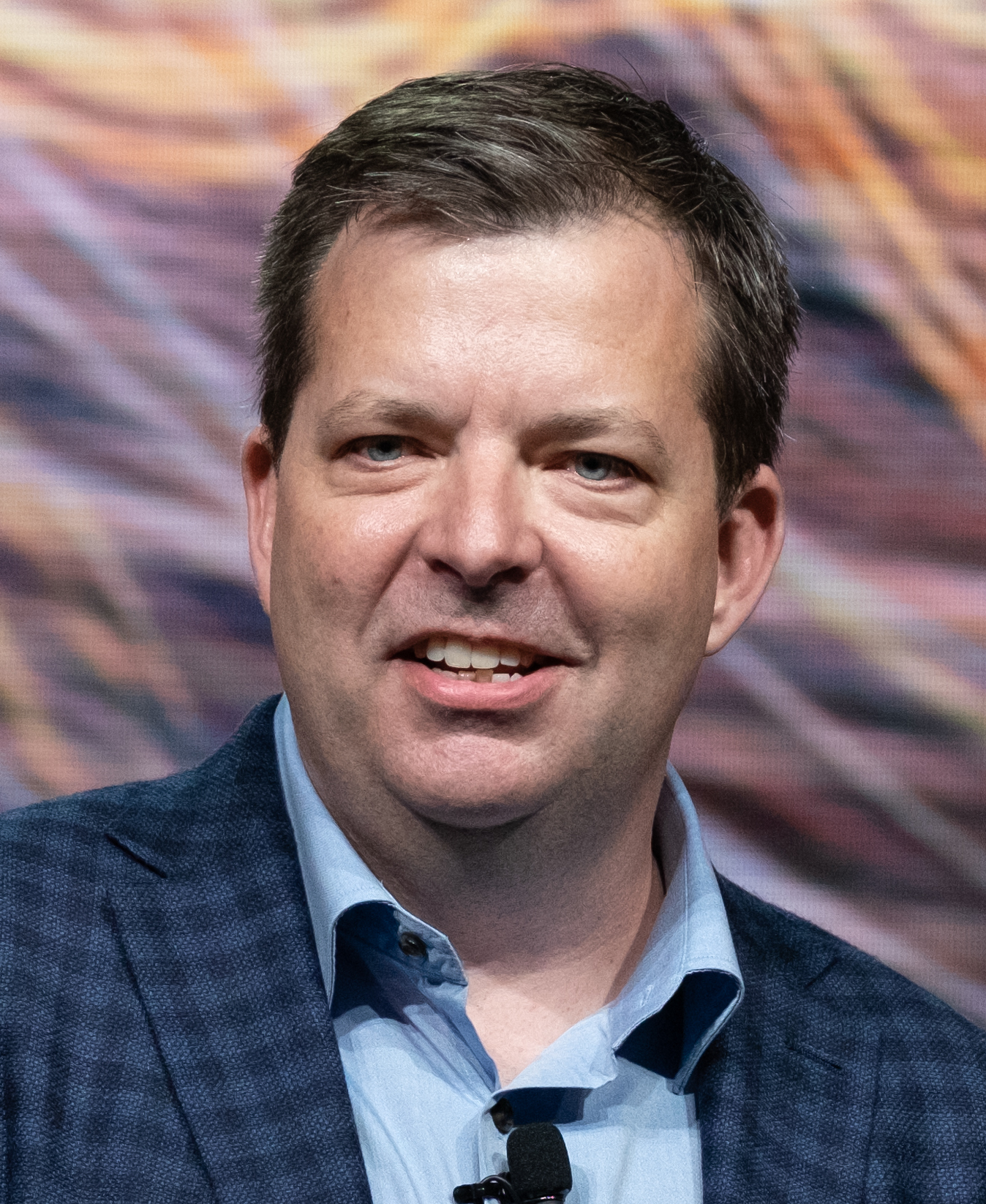
- Education: University of Ottawa; University of Edinburgh
- Occupation: Software executive
- Title: CEO of the Mozilla Corporation

Chris Beard is a Canadian business leader, and former CEO of the Mozilla Corporation.

In January 1998, he co-founded The Puffin Group in Ottawa, Canada, which was acquired by Linuxcare less than two years later. Since then, Beard has mostly worked in senior product and marketing roles in a range of companies, including HP, Cluster File Systems, Inc. (acquired by Sun Microsystems) and Mozilla. He joined Mozilla in 2004, specifically to launch the Firefox browser but also having responsibilities for other areas of the organisation, including product, marketing, innovation, communications, community and user engagement at different times during his nine years there. Prior to his appointment as CEO he most recently served as Chief Marketing Officer.

In July 2013 he joined Greylock Partners as an executive in residence, though remaining an advisor to Mitchell Baker, Mozilla's Chair.

Beard was appointed in April 2014 as the interim CEO at Mozilla Corporation. On July 28, Beard was confirmed in the position.

He is a runner, his first half-marathon being the 2010 Walt Disney World Half Marathon and his first full marathon being the 2013 Rock 'n' Roll San Diego Marathon.

In 2014, he was appointed to the national board of the Make-a-Wish Foundation.

He has an MBA in International Business from the University of Edinburgh Business School (2002–04), where he was also awarded the John McFarlane Prize for Leadership. He previously read economics and biochemistry at the University of Ottawa (1994–96).

On August 29, 2019, Mozilla and Beard jointly announced that 2019 will be his last year as CEO of Mozilla.

Preceded by Brendan Eich	Interim CEO of Mozilla Corporation; 14 April 2014 – 28 July 2014	Succeeded by Mitchell Baker
Preceded by Brendan Eich	CEO of Mozilla Corporation; 28 July 2014 – December 2019	Succeeded by Mitchell Baker
