= Carbon to Sea Initiative =

The Carbon to Sea Initiative is an international non-profit scientific research program founded by Additional Ventures. It is a consortium of philanthropies.

== Background ==
The Carbon to Sea Initiative was founded by Mike Schroepfer, who served previously as Meta Platforms' chief technology officer. It was spun out of Schroepfer's fund Additional Ventures and is chaired by Schroepfer.

=== Research ===
In 2023, it raised more than US$50 million for research into ocean alkalinity and if its modification could be an effective way to remove carbon dioxide from the Earth's atmosphere. As part of that research effort, Dalhousie University received $15 million in research funding.
