= Accela =

American private government technology company

- Type: Private
- Industry: Software development, GovTech
- Founded: 1999
- Founder: Robert Ausherman
- Headquarters: San Ramon, California, U.S.
- Key people: Noam Reininger (CEO)
- Services: Implementation services; Managed application services; Accela U
- Number of employees: 201-500
- Website: accela.com

Accela is an American private government technology company. It was established in 1999 as a result of a merger with Sierra Computer Systems and Open Data Systems. Accela's platform is used by state and local government agencies in the United States and in other countries.

== History ==
Accela was founded in 1999 as a result of a merger with Sierra Computer Systems and Open Data Systems.

Between 2014 and 2015, Accela acquired ten companies including PublicStuff, GeoTMS, IQM2, Envista, Kinsail, Government Outreach, Decade Software, Civic Insight, Springbrook Software, and SoftRight. In 2017, Accela was acquired by Berkshire Partners.

In September 2018, Accela partnered with Microsoft Azure to power its cloud-based services. On December 10, 2018, Gary Kovacs was named chief executive officer of Accela.

On September 6, 2023, Francisco Partners announced a new investment in Accela. Berkshire Partners remains as a significant investor.

On January 16, 2024, Accela welcomed new CEO Noam Reininger.

In October 2025, Nortal acquired Accela's Middle East division.

== Usage ==
Government agencies that use Accela's platform include those of San Joaquin County, California; Pima County, Arizona; San Antonio, Texas; San Diego, California; Baltimore County, Maryland; New York City's Department of Health and Mental Hygiene; the city and county of Denver, Colorado; El Paso, Texas; Brownsville, Texas; Indianapolis, Indiana; Salt Lake City, Utah; Culver City, California; Cabarrus County, North Carolina; several cities and counties across Florida; and Abu Dhabi.

The Accela Civic Platform digitizes governmental processes. Accela's Civic Applications aid governments in delivering various services, such as permitting, licensing, and code enforcement. Accela also has permitting applications for solar energy and natural disasters.
