= Mike Schroepfer =

American businessman (born 1975)

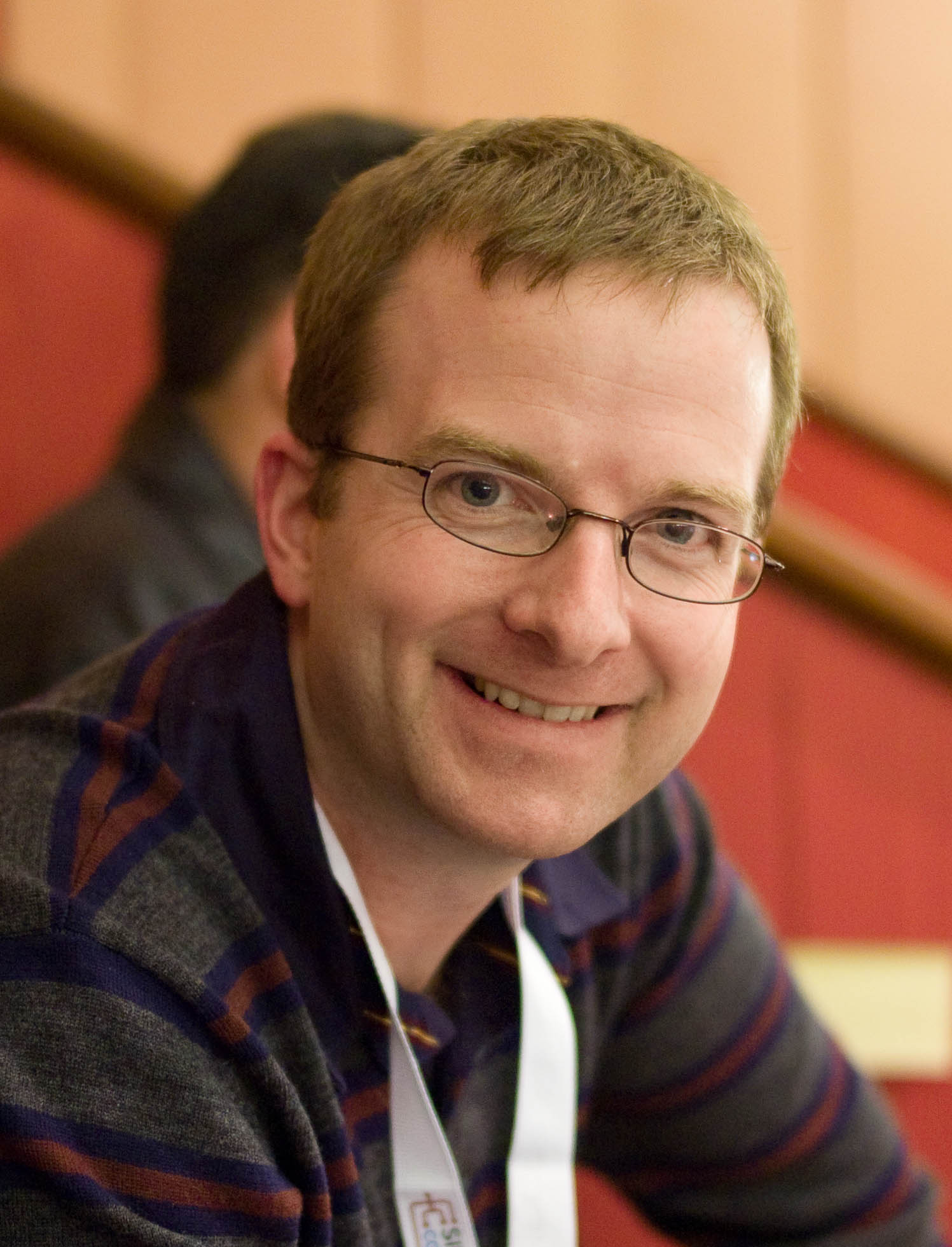
- Schroepfer in 2010
- Born: February 1, 1975 (age 51)
- Education: Stanford University (BS, MS)
- Occupation: CTO at Meta Platforms (2013–2022)
- Known for: Climate investment and philanthropy
- Predecessor: Bret Taylor

Mike Schroepfer (born February 1, 1975) is an entrepreneur, technical architect, climate investor, and philanthropist who was the chief technology officer (CTO) at Meta Platforms between March 2013 and March 2022. In 2022 he transitioned to become Senior Fellow at Meta to focus on investing and philanthropic work related to addressing the climate crisis. Schroepfer's current focus is investing in tech and science to fight climate change through his venture capital firm Gigascale Capital, philanthropic entity Additional Ventures, and as board chair of the Carbon to Sea Initiative.

== Education ==
Schroepfer grew up in Boca Raton, Florida. He attended Spanish River Community High School in Palm Beach County, graduating in 1993. He holds a bachelor's degree (1997) and a master's degree (1999) in computer science from Stanford University.

== Career ==
He was an engineer at computer software company Puffin Designs from October 1997 to November 1999, when he became a partner in Reactivity, Inc., a computer software consulting practice.

Schroepfer founded the computer software company CenterRun in June 2000, becoming its chief architect and director of engineering. CenterRun was acquired by Sun Microsystems in November 2003. After the takeover, he became the chief technology officer for Sun's data center automation division ("N1"). Schroepfer was the vice president of engineering at Mozilla Corporation from July 2005 to August 2008, where he led the development of the Firefox web browser.

He became director of engineering at Facebook in July 2008. In 2008 he was listed as number 20 in the 25 Most Influential People in Mobile Technology by Laptopmag.com. In 2010 Fortune listed him and two colleagues at Facebook's technical branch as joint number 27 in their list of the 40 under 40. Schroepfer has been known for his work on artificial intelligence at Facebook. Particularly, he gained attention amid the social media network's attempt to address the proliferation of false, misleading, and inappropriate content within the platform. It was reported that Mark Zuckerberg believes that Facebook can address the problem through its proprietary AI technology, which initially focused on greater facial recognition capability and better ad targeting. According to Schroepfer, Facebook's AI succeeded at certain types of content moderation. For example, its image classifier algorithms can automatically identify and delete photos and videos that contain nudity.

Schroepfer became a member of the board of directors for investment management firm, Wealthfront, announced on November 16, 2015.

Schroepfer co-founded Additional Ventures with wife Erin Hoffman as "a purpose-driven organization leveraging evidence-based research and deep subject matter expertise to make an outsized impact." The non-profit make grants in service of its mission to shape a healthier, more equitable world with a focus on Biomedical Research, Climate Action, and Community & Democracy.

On 23 September 2021, Schroepfer announced that he would be stepping down from the role of CTO at Facebook in 2022. He transitioned to become Senior Fellow at Meta, focusing on artificial intelligence and the development of technical talent, and pursuing climate investment and advocacy in his personal time.

On 2 May 2023, Schroepfer launched a new climate investment firm called Gigascale Capital. Gigascale Capital invests in early-stage companies solving the climate crisis, and is built around the belief that tech and entrepreneurship can create climate-friendly options that are better than the high carbon incumbents.

In June 2023, Schroepfer announced that Additional Ventures had created and spun out a nonprofit dedicated to accelerating research into ocean alkalinity enhancement called the Carbon to Sea Initiative. He currently serves its board chair. The initiative has raised over $50 million to back research and development into exploring the potential to accelerate carbon dioxide absorption into the ocean.

Schroepfer currently lives in the San Francisco Bay Area.

== See also ==
- Facebook, Inc.
- Criticism of Facebook
