= Mozilla Corporation =

American software company

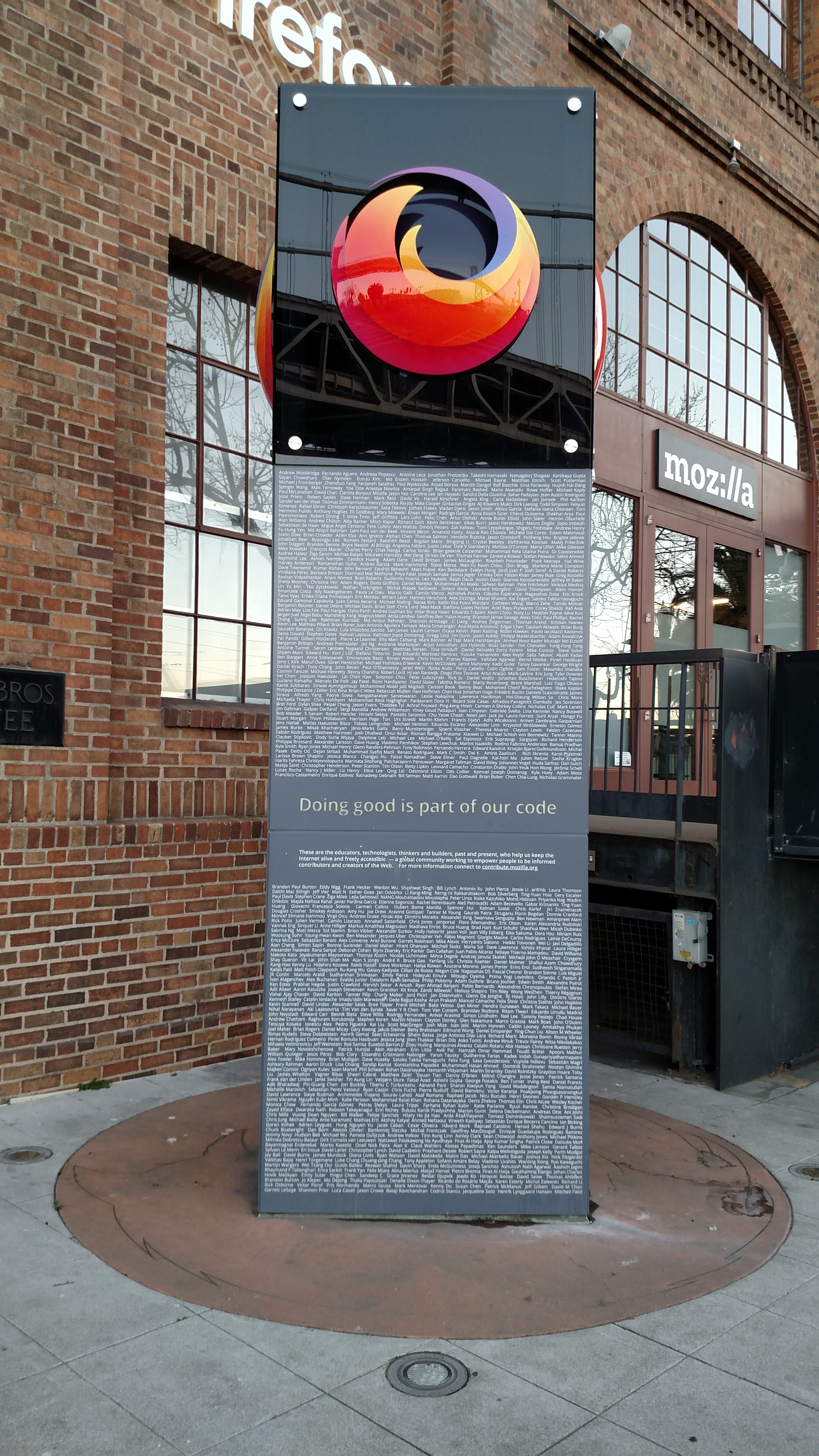
- The monument in front of Mozilla's headquarters in San Francisco, California
- Type: Subsidiary
- Industry: Software
- Founded: August 3, 2005; 21 years ago
- Headquarters: San Francisco, California, U.S.
- Key people: Anthony Enzor-DeMeo
- Products: Mozilla Firefox; Pocket; More
- Revenue: ▲US$680 million (2024)
- Number of employees: ▼ ~750 (2020)
- Parent: Mozilla Foundation
- Website: www.mozilla.org

The Mozilla Corporation is a wholly owned taxable subsidiary of the Mozilla Foundation that coordinates and integrates the development of Internet-related applications such as the Firefox web browser, by a global community of open-source developers, some of whom are employed by the corporation itself. The corporation also distributes and promotes these products. Unlike the non-profit Mozilla Foundation, and the Mozilla open source project, founded by the now defunct Netscape Communications Corporation, the Mozilla Corporation is a for-profit entity. The Mozilla Corporation reinvests all of its profits back into the Mozilla projects. The Mozilla Corporation's stated aim is to work towards the Mozilla Foundation's public benefit to "promote choice and innovation on the Internet."

A MozillaZine article explained:

The Mozilla Foundation will ultimately control the activities of the Mozilla Corporation and will retain its 100 percent ownership of the new subsidiary. Any profits made by the Mozilla Corporation will be invested back into the Mozilla project. There will be no shareholders, no stock options will be issued and no dividends will be paid. The Mozilla Corporation will not be floating on the stock market and it will be impossible for any company to take over or buy a stake in the subsidiary. The Mozilla Foundation will continue to own the Mozilla trademarks and other intellectual property and will license them to the Mozilla Corporation. The Foundation will also continue to govern the source code repository and control who is allowed to check in.

== Establishment ==
The Mozilla Corporation was established on August 3, 2005, to handle the revenue-related operations of the Mozilla Foundation. As a non-profit, the Mozilla Foundation is limited in terms of the types and amounts of revenue it can have. The Mozilla Corporation, which is the for-profit component of the Mozilla Organization, does not have to comply with such strict rules. Upon its creation, the Mozilla Corporation took over several areas from the Mozilla Foundation, including coordination and integration of the development of Firefox and Thunderbird (by the global free software community) and the management of relationships with businesses.

With the creation of the Mozilla Corporation, the rest of the Mozilla Foundation narrowed its focus to concentrate on the Mozilla project's governance and policy issues. In November 2005, with the release of Mozilla Firefox 1.5, the Mozilla Corporation's website at mozilla.com was unveiled as the new home of the Firefox and Thunderbird products online.

In 2006, the Mozilla Corporation generated $66.8 million in revenue and $19.8 million in expenses, with 85% of that revenue coming from Google for "assigning [Google] as the browser's default search engine, and for click-throughs on ads placed on the ensuing search results pages."

Mozilla Taiwan (Chinese: 美商謀智; pinyin: Měishāng Móuzhì) was a branch of the corporation founded in October 19, 2011, that promoted and deployed Mozilla products in Taiwan. It ceased operations on August 11, 2020, due to a "significant restructuring" of its parent company.

== Finances ==
Most of the revenue of Mozilla Corporation comes from Google (86% in 2024) in exchange for making it the default search engine in Firefox.

Consolidated financial results of Mozilla Foundation and subsidiaries
Year	Total revenue	Revenue derived from Google	Total expenses	Software development expenses	Reference
2005	$52.9 million	95% ($50.3 million)			
2006	$66.9 million	90% ($60.2 million)			
2007	$81 million	88% ($71.3 million)			
2008	$78.6 million	91% ($71.5 million)			
2009		86%			
2010	$123 million	84% ($103.3 million)	$87 million	$63 million	
2011	$163.5 million	85% ($139 million)	$145 million	$103 million	
2012	$311 million	90% ($280 million)	$208 million	$149 million	
2013	$314 million	90% ($282.6 million)	$295 million	$197 million	
2014	$420 million	90% ($378 million)	$317 million	$213 million	
2015	$420 million	90% ($378 million) (from Yahoo, not Google)	$337 million	$214 million	
2016	$520 million	94% ($488.8 million)	$360 million	$225 million	
2017	$562 million	93% ($522.7 million)	$421 million	$259 million	
2018	$450 million	91% ($409.5 million)	$451 million	$277 million	
2019	$829 million	88% ($405.9 million)	$495 million	$303 million	
2020	$497 million	86% ($427.4 million)	$438 million	$242 million	
2021	$600 million	83% ($498 million)	$339 million	$199 million	
2022	$593 million	81% ($480 million)	$425 million	$220 million	
2023	$653 million	85% ($555 million)	$496 million	$260 million	
2024	$680 million	86% ($585 million)	$588 million	$290 million	

== Notable events ==
In March 2006, Jason Calacanis reported a rumor on his blog that Mozilla Corporation gained $72M during the previous year, mainly thanks to the Google search box in the Firefox browser. The rumor was later addressed by Christopher Blizzard, then a member of the board, who wrote on his blog that, "it's not correct, though not off by an order of magnitude." Two years later, TechCrunch wrote: "In return for setting Google as the default search engine on Firefox, Google pays Mozilla a substantial sum – in 2006, the total amounted to around $57 million, or 85% of the company's total revenue. The deal was originally going to expire in 2006, but was later extended to 2008 and then ran through 2011." The deal was extended again another 3 years, until November 2014. Under the deal, Mozilla was to have received from Google another $900 million ($300 million annually), nearly 3 times the previous amount. The partnership to use Google as the default search engine was resumed after a three-year hiatus in 2017.

In August 2006, Microsoft invited Mozilla employees to collaborate to ensure compatibility of Mozilla software with then upcoming Windows Vista operating system. Microsoft offered to host one-to-one at the new open-source facility at Microsoft headquarters in Redmond, Wash. Mozilla accepted the offer.

In March 2014, Mozilla came under some criticism after it appointed Brendan Eich as its new chief executive officer (CEO). In 2008, Eich had made a $1,000 contribution in support of California Proposition 8, a ballot initiative that barred legal recognition of same-sex marriages in California. Three of six Mozilla board members reportedly resigned over the choice of CEO, though Mozilla said the resigning board members had "a variety of reasons" and reasserted its continued commitment to LGBT equality, including same-sex marriage. On April 1, the online dating site OkCupid started displaying visitors using Mozilla Firefox a message urging them to switch to a different web browser, pointing out that 8% of the matches made on OkCupid are between same-sex couples. On April 3, Mozilla announced that Eich had decided to step down as CEO and also leave the board of Mozilla Foundation. This, in turn, prompted a response from some commentators who criticized the pressure that led Eich to resign. For example, Conor Friedersdorf argued in The Atlantic that "the general practice of punishing people in business for bygone political donations is most likely to entrench powerful interests and weaken the ability of the powerless to challenge the status quo."

In April 2014, Chris Beard, the former chief marketing officer of Mozilla, was appointed interim CEO. Beard was named CEO on July 28 of the same year.

On February 27, 2017, Mozilla acquired the bookmark manager and suggestion service Pocket. In accordance with Mozilla's history of operating as "open by default" and based on comments by Mozilla chief business officer Denelle Dixon-Thayer that Pocket would "become part of the Mozilla open source project", it was reported that Pocket would become open source. Prior to the acquisition, the startup behind Pocket operated it as a closed source, commercial service, and Mozilla published the source code that added a "Save to Pocket" feature to Firefox as open source. As of August 2020, Pocket remained closed source, while the extension remained open source. On May 22, 2025, Mozilla announced that it would shut down Pocket on July 8, 2025. Exports of user data would be available until October 8, 2025, when accounts would be deleted.

In February 2017, Mozilla dissolved its IoT "Connected Devices" initiative, laying off around 50 employees, to focus on "Emerging Technologies" like AR, VR and Servo/Rust.

On August 29, 2019, Mozilla and Chris Beard jointly announced that 2019 would be Beard's last year as CEO of Mozilla. In December, Mitchell Baker became the interim CEO, before being named CEO in April 2020.

In January 2020, it was reported that Mozilla would be laying off 70 employees after the new revenue streams could not deliver the expected revenue quickly enough. In August 2020, Mozilla announced restructuring that will close down Mozilla operations in Taipei, Taiwan, and reduce Mozilla's workforce in the United States, Canada, Europe, Australia, and New Zealand. All together, about 250 people would be let go with severance packages and around 60 people would be reassigned to different projects or teams. Mozilla is "reducing investment in some areas such as developer tools, internal tooling, and platform feature development" and reorganizing "security/privacy products" to prioritize revenue-generating projects. Shortly after the announcement of staff cuts, Mozilla insiders leaked information that the Google search deal will be extended until 2023 instead of expiring in 2020, meaning the corporation financial state is stable.

In December 2020, Mozilla closed its headquarters office in Mountain View, citing reduced need for office space due to the COVID-19 pandemic. The title of headquarters went to the San Francisco office.

In May 2023, Mozilla acquired the startup Fakespot. The company, which was founded by Saoud Khalifah, specialized in identifying fake product reviews on e-commerce websites. Mozilla integrated their technology into Firefox while maintaining its existing website and browser extensions. Fakespot features were scheduled to be disabled in June and July 2025; Mozilla said these features were unsustainable.

On February 8, 2024, Mozilla announced that Mitchell Baker would be stepping down as CEO, effective immediately, to focus on AI and internet safety in her role as chair of the Mozilla Foundation. Mozilla board member Laura Chambers was announced as interim CEO. On February 14, 2024, Mozilla Corporation announced a strategic shift toward building generative-AI features into Firefox and other flagship products, cutting about 60 roles (≈ 5% of staff) and winding down several standalone privacy services. Earlier, on March 22, 2023, Mozilla committed US $30 million to launch Mozilla.ai, a wholly owned subsidiary aiming to build an open-source ecosystem for "trustworthy" artificial intelligence.

In March 2024, Mozilla patched two critical zero-day vulnerabilities in Firefox that were demonstrated at the Pwn2Own hacking competition. The vulnerabilities, identified as CVE-2024-29943 and CVE-2024-29944, were promptly addressed in Firefox version 124.0.1.

In September 2024, Mozilla unveiled a new brand identity, featuring a redesigned logo inspired by its Netscape origins. The rebranding aimed to distinguish Mozilla's corporate identity from its Firefox browser and emphasize its activist spirit.

In November 2024, the Mozilla Foundation laid off approximately 30% of its workforce, eliminating its advocacy and global programs divisions. The move was part of a strategic shift to focus on core initiatives amid financial pressures.

In December 2025, Anthony Enzor-DeMeo was announced as the new CEO of Mozilla Corporation, who expressed a desire to transition Firefox into a "modern AI browser".

== Affiliations ==
=== Google ===
The Mozilla Corporation's relationship with Google has been noted in the popular press, especially with regard to their paid referral agreement. Mozilla's original deal with Google to have Google Search as the default web search engine in the browser expired in 2011, but a new deal was struck, where Google agreed to pay Mozilla just under a billion dollars over three years until 2017 in exchange for keeping Google as its default search engine. The price was driven up due to aggressive bidding from Microsoft's Bing and Yahoo!'s presence in the auction as well. Despite the deal, Mozilla Firefox maintains relationships with Bing, Yahoo!, Yandex, Baidu, Amazon.com and eBay. The partnership with Google was renewed in 2017 and remains active as of 2022.

In 2022, 81% of Mozilla's revenues were derived from Google.

The 2007 release of the anti-phishing protection in Firefox 2 in particular raised considerable controversy: Anti-phishing protection, enabled by default, is based on a list updated twice hourly from Google's servers. The browser also sends a cookie with each update request. Internet privacy advocacy groups have expressed concerns surrounding Google's possible uses for this data, especially since Firefox's privacy policy states that Google may share (non-personally identifying) information gathered through safe browsing with third parties, including business partners.

Following Google CEO Eric Schmidt's comments in December 2009 regarding privacy during a CNBC show, Asa Dotzler, Mozilla's director of community development suggested that users use the Bing search engine instead of Google search. Google also promoted Firefox through YouTube until the release of Google Chrome.

In 2024, the U.S. Department of Justice proposed antitrust remedies that could impact Google's ability to maintain default search engine agreements, including its deal with Mozilla. Mozilla expressed concerns that such measures might inadvertently harm independent browser developers without significantly enhancing search competition. In September 2025, judge imposed measures that, for six years, prohibit Google from entering into exclusive distribution agreements for Google Search, Chrome, Google Assistant and the Gemini app while permitting ongoing (non-exclusive) payments to Apple, Mozilla and other distributors of search engines. In August 2026, US federal and state competition authorities asked the court of appeals to overturn part of the ruling which permits these payments and forbid all paid search engine distribution agreements.

=== Yahoo ===
In November 2014, Mozilla signed a five-year partnership with Yahoo!, making Yahoo Search the default search engine for Firefox browsers in the US. With the release of Firefox Quantum on November 17, 2017, Google became the default search engine again.

Mozilla's deal with Yahoo was to generate $375 million a year for Mozilla. But in 2017, after Yahoo was purchased by Verizon, Mozilla used a clause in the contract to end it, returning Google as the default search engine.

Mozilla received $338 million in 2019 from the settlement with Verizon.

=== Microsoft ===
Microsoft's head of Australian operations, Steve Vamos, stated in late 2004 that he did not see Firefox as a threat and that there was not significant demand for the feature-set of Firefox among Microsoft's users. Microsoft Chairman Bill Gates has used Firefox, but has commented that "it's just another browser, and IE [Microsoft's Internet Explorer] is better".

A Microsoft SEC filing on June 30, 2005, acknowledged that "competitors such as Mozilla offer software that competes with the Internet Explorer Web browsing capabilities of our Windows operating system products." The release of Internet Explorer 7 was fast tracked, and included functionality that was previously available in Firefox and other browsers, such as tabbed browsing and RSS feeds.

Despite the cold reception from Microsoft's top management, the Internet Explorer development team maintains a relationship with Mozilla. They meet regularly to discuss web standards such as extended validation certificates. In 2005, Mozilla agreed to allow Microsoft to use its Web feed logo in the interest of common graphical representation of the Web feeds feature.

In August 2006, Microsoft offered to help Mozilla integrate Firefox with the then-forthcoming Windows Vista, an offer Mozilla accepted.

In October 2006, as congratulations for a successful ship of Firefox 2, the Internet Explorer 7 development team sent a cake to Mozilla. As a nod to the browser wars, some jokingly suggested that Mozilla should send a cake back along with the recipe, in reference to the open-source software movement. The IE development team sent another cake on June 17, 2008, upon the successful release of Firefox 3, again on March 22, 2011, for Firefox 4, and yet again for the Firefox 5 release.

In November 2007, Jeff Jones (a "security strategy director" in Microsoft's Trustworthy Computing Group) criticized Firefox, claiming that Internet Explorer experienced fewer vulnerabilities and fewer higher severity vulnerabilities than Firefox in typical enterprise scenarios. Mozilla developer Mike Shaver discounted the study, citing Microsoft's bundling of security fixes and the study's focus on fixes, rather than vulnerabilities, as crucial flaws.

In February 2009, Microsoft released Service Pack 1 for version 3.5 of the .NET Framework. This update also installed Microsoft .NET Framework Assistant add-on (enabling ClickOnce support). The update received media attention after users discovered that the add-on could not be uninstalled through the add-ons interface. Several hours after the website Annoyances.org posted an article regarding this update, Microsoft employee Brad Abrams posted in his blog Microsoft's explanation for why the add-on was installed, and also included detailed instructions on how to remove it. However, the only way to get rid of this extension was to modify the Windows Registry manually, which could cause Windows systems to fail to boot if done incorrectly.

On October 16, 2009, Mozilla blocked all versions of Microsoft .NET Framework Assistant from being used with Firefox and from the Mozilla Add-ons service. Two days later, the add-on was removed from the blocklist after confirmation from Microsoft that it is not a vector for vulnerabilities. Version 1.1 (released on June 10, 2009, to the Mozilla Add-ons service) and later of the Microsoft .NET Framework Assistant allows the user to disable and uninstall in the normal fashion.

Firefox was one of the twelve browsers offered to European Economic Area users of Microsoft Windows from 2010 – see BrowserChoice.eu.

=== IRS audit ===
The Internal Revenue Service opened an audit of the Mozilla Foundation's 2004-5 revenues in 2008, due to its search royalties, and in 2009, the investigation was expanded to the 2006 and 2007 tax years, though that part of the audit was closed. As Mozilla does not derive at least a third of its revenue from public donations, it does not automatically qualify as a public charity.

In November 2012, the audit was closed after finding that the Mozilla Foundation owed a settlement of $1.5 million to the IRS.

== People ==
Most Mozilla Foundation employees transferred to the new organization at Mozilla Corporation's founding.

=== Board of directors ===
The board of directors is appointed by and responsible to Mozilla Foundation's board. In March 2014, half the board members resigned. The remaining board members were:

- Mitchell Baker, Executive Chairwoman
- Julie Hanna
- Karim Lakhani
- Laura Chambers

As of 2025, the board members are:

- Kerry W. Cooper, Chair of the Compensation Committee and Member of the Audit Committee
- Laura Chambers
- Bob Lisbonne, Chair of the Audit Committee and Member of the Nominating and Governance Committee
- Hugh Molotsi, Chair of the Nominating and Governance Committee and Member of the Compensation Committee
- Kristin Skogen Lund, member of the Audit Committee
- Mark Surman

=== Management team ===
The senior management team includes:

- Anthony Enzor-DeMeo, CEO
- John Solomon, CMO
- Peter Rojas, SVP of New Products
- Eric Muhlheim, CFO
- Carlos Torres, Chief Legal Officer

=== Notable current employees ===
- Gian-Carlo Pascutto
- Julian Seward
- Tantek Çelik

=== Notable past employees ===
- Brendan Eich, former CEO of Mozilla Corporation, inventor of JavaScript (now CEO of Brave)
- John Lilly, former CEO of Mozilla Corporation
- Christopher Blizzard, former Open Source Evangelist (now at Facebook)
- John Resig, former Technical Evangelist (now at Khan Academy)
- Mike Schroepfer, former VP of Engineering (now at Facebook)
- Mike Shaver, former VP of Technical Strategy (now at Shopify)
- Window Snyder, former Chief Security Officer (now at Square, Inc.)
- Ellen Siminoff, former board member, also President and CEO of Shmoop University and Chair of Efficient Frontier
- Li Gong, president of Mozilla Corporation until 2015
- Andreas Gal, former CTO (now at Apple)
- Johnny Stenback, former engineering director (now at Google Chrome)
- John Hammink
- Tristan Nitot
