= Mozilla =

Free and open-source software community, developer of Firefox and Thunderbird

- Logo since 2024
- Industry: Free software, Online advertising
- Founded: March 31, 1998; 28 years ago
- Founder: Netscape Communications Corporation
- Headquarters: San Francisco
- Products: Firefox
- Parent: Mozilla Foundation
- Divisions: Mozilla Corporation
- Website: mozilla.org

Mozilla is a free software community founded in 1998 by members of Netscape. The Mozilla community uses, develops, publishes, and supports Mozilla products, thereby promoting free software and open standards. The community is supported institutionally by the non-profit Mozilla Foundation and its tax-paying subsidiary, the Mozilla Corporation.

Mozilla's current products include the Firefox web browser, Thunderbird e-mail client (now through a subsidiary), the Bugzilla bug tracking system, and the Gecko layout engine.

== History ==
Mozilla's former symbol, as designed by Shepard Fairey in 1998

Mozilla's logo prior to 2024

Mitchell Baker telling the early history of Mozilla

On January 23, 1998, Netscape announced that its Netscape Communicator browser software would be free, and that its source code would also be free. One day later, Jamie Zawinski of Netscape registered mozilla.org. The project took its name, "Mozilla", from the original code name of the Netscape Navigator browser—a portmanteau of "Mosaic and Godzilla", and used to coordinate the development of the Mozilla Application Suite, the free software version of Netscape's internet software, Netscape Communicator. Zawinski said he arrived at the name "Mozilla" at a Netscape staff meeting. A small group of Netscape employees were tasked with coordinating the new community.

Mozilla originally aimed to be a technology provider for companies such as Netscape, who would commercialise their free software code. When Netscape's parent company AOL greatly reduced its involvement with Mozilla in July 2003, the Mozilla Foundation was designated the project's legal steward. Soon after, Mozilla deprecated the Mozilla Suite in favor of creating independent applications for each function, primarily the Firefox web browser and the Thunderbird email client, and moved to supply them directly to the public.

Mozilla's activities next expanded, and also experienced product terminations, with Firefox on mobile platforms (primarily Android), a mobile OS called Firefox OS (since cancelled), a web-based identity system called Mozilla Persona (since cancelled) and a marketplace for HTML5 applications.

In a report released in November 2012, Mozilla reported that its revenue for 2011 was $163 million, up 33% from $123 million in 2010. It noted that roughly 85% of their revenue came from their contract with Google.

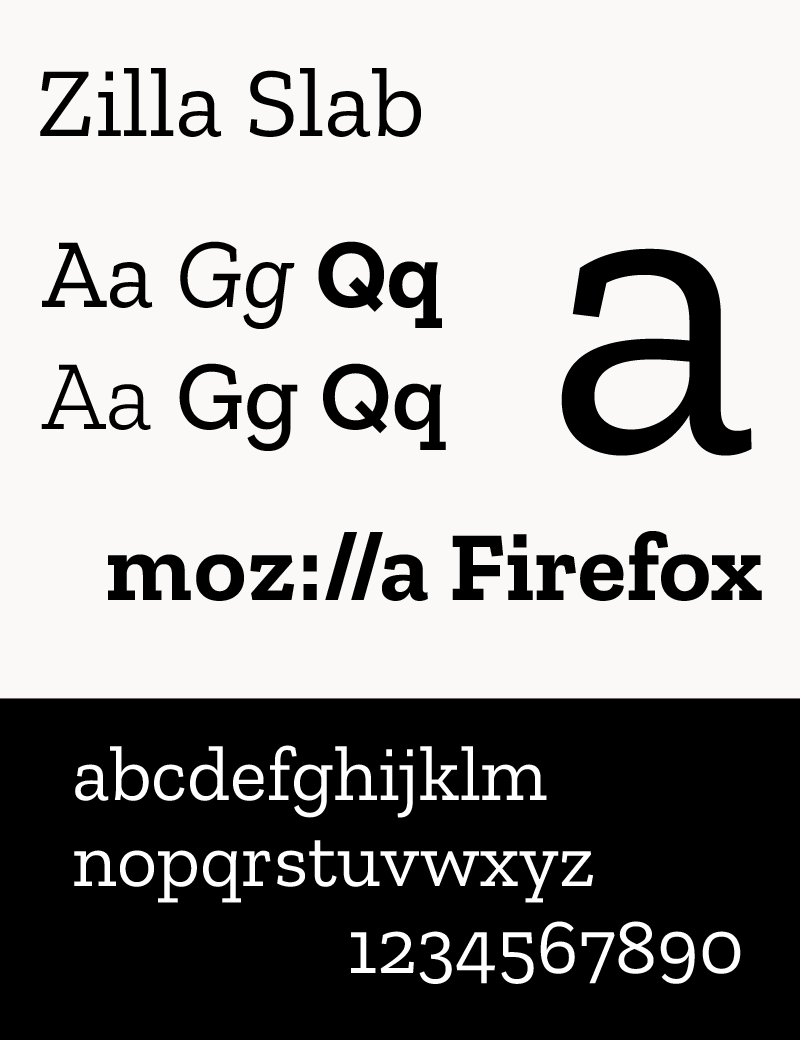
Zilla Slab, Mozilla's typeface from 2017 to 2024

At the end of 2013, Mozilla announced a deal with Cisco, whereby Firefox would download and use a Cisco-provided binary build of an open-source codec to play the proprietary H.264 video format. As part of the deal, Cisco would pay any patent licensing fees associated with the binaries that it distributed. Mozilla's CTO, Brendan Eich, acknowledged that it was "not a complete solution" and wasn't "perfect". An employee in Mozilla's video formats team, writing unofficially, justified it by the need to maintain their large user base, which would be necessary for future battles for truly free video formats.

In December 2013, Mozilla announced funding for the development of paid games through its Game Creator Challenge. However, even games that would be released under non-free or free software licenses were required to be made with open web technologies and JavaScript. In January 2017 the company rebranded away from its dinosaur symbol in favor of a logo including a "://" character sequence from a URL: "moz://a". As a part of the rebranding, it commissioned the open source slab serif font Zilla Slab.

In 2020 Mozilla announced it would cut 25% of its worldwide staff of nearly 1,000 to reduce costs. Firefox has fallen from 30% market share to 4% in 10 years. Despite this, executive pay increased 400%, with Mitchell Baker, Mozilla’s top executive, receiving $2.4m in 2018. In December 2020, Mozilla closed its Mountain View office.

Mozilla rebranded again in 2024 with a new "Reclaim the Internet" motto. The rebrand was assisted by Jones Knowles Ritchie, As a part of the rebranding, it commissioned a new open source fonts Mozilla Headline and Mozilla Text, both designed by Studio DRAMA.

In November 2025, Mozilla outlined a three-year strategy focused on applying its open-web principles to artificial intelligence, including open-source AI, and reducing its dependence on search revenue. In December, Mozilla Corporation appointed Anthony Enzor-DeMeo as chief executive officer, succeeding interim CEO Laura Chambers. In the beginning of 2026, Mozilla announced that about 80% of its planned portfolio spending would remain directed toward core products, including Firefox and Thunderbird, while about 20% would support open-source and trustworthy AI initiatives.

== Values ==
Seeking new products and roles while sustaining commitment to Firefox though Firefox's market share has so far dwindled dramatically, Executive Chairwoman and CEO Baker, Chief Product Officer Steve Teixeira and Mozilla Foundation Executive Director Mark Surman told Tech Crunch in November 2022 that fundamental business models are being rethought, and new roles in the internet as a human institution, that Mozilla's next 25 years' plan was in search of specifying projects for revised detailed purposes. The one actual general vehicle implemented "has meant the launch of Mozilla Ventures, a $35 million venture fund that the organization plans to use to invest in products and founders who want to build a better, privacy-respecting internet."

Mozilla has used or promoted non-free resources in some circumstances, such as licensing the H.264 codec and promoting the development of paid games using open technologies.

=== Mozilla Manifesto ===
The Mozilla Manifesto outlines Mozilla's goals and principles. It asserts Mozilla's commitment to the internet, saying: "The open, global internet is the most powerful communication and collaboration resource we have ever seen. It embodies some of our deepest hopes for human progress." It then outlines what Mozilla sees as its place in the development of the internet, stating "The Mozilla project uses a community-based approach to create world-class open source software and to develop new types of collaborative activities". And finally, it lays out their ten principles:

1. The internet is an integral part of modern life—a key component in education, communication, collaboration, business, entertainment, and society as a whole.
2. The internet is a global public resource that must remain open and accessible.
3. The internet must enrich the lives of individual human beings.
4. Individuals’ security and privacy on the internet are fundamental and must not be treated as optional.
5. Individuals must have the ability to shape the internet and their own experiences on it.
6. The effectiveness of the internet as a public resource depends upon interoperability (protocols, data formats, content), innovation, and decentralised participation worldwide.
7. Free and open source software promotes the development of the internet as a public resource.
8. Transparent community-based processes promote participation, accountability, and trust.
9. Commercial involvement in the development of the internet brings many benefits; a balance between commercial profit and public benefit is critical.
10. Magnifying the public benefit aspects of the internet is an important goal, worthy of time, attention, and commitment.

=== Pledge ===
According to the Mozilla Foundation:

The Mozilla Foundation pledges to support the Mozilla Manifesto in its activities. Specifically, we will:

1. Build and enable open-source technologies and communities that support the Manifesto’s principles;
2. Build and deliver great consumer products that support the Manifesto’s principles;
3. Use the Mozilla assets (intellectual property such as copyrights and trademarks, infrastructure, funds, and reputation) to keep the Internet an open platform;
4. Promote models for creating economic value for the public benefit; and
5. Promote the Mozilla Manifesto principles in public discourse and within the Internet industry.

== Venture incubation ==
=== Mozilla Builders ===
Throughout 2020, Mozilla ran Mozilla Builders, "an experimental 'Fix-The-Internet' incubator program". It funded 80 projects through three subprograms: The Startup Studio, The MVP Lab and The Open Lab. The site for this program is now archived.

=== Mozilla Ventures ===
On November 2, 2022, at the Web Summit in Lisbon, Portugal and simultaneously online, Mozilla announced the early 2023 launch of Mozilla Ventures, a venture capital and product incubation facility out of Mozilla for independent start-ups, seed to Series A which qualify under the ethos of the Mozilla Manifesto, with a starting fund of $35 million. Its founding Managing Partner is Mohamed Nanabhay who told Entrepreneur India the purpose is "to create an ecosystem of entrepreneurs from across the world who are building companies that create a better internet".

Mozilla Foundation President and Executive Director Mark Surman named the first 3 investment recipients in the Mozilla Ventures mode, in discussions before Mozilla Ventures was announced, as Secure AI Labs, Block Party and HeyLogin.

== Software ==
=== Firefox ===
The revamped Firefox logo

Firefox is a family of software products developed by Mozilla, with the Firefox browser as the flagship product.

==== Firefox browser ====
The Firefox web browser is available in both desktop and mobile versions. It uses the Gecko layout engine to render web pages, which implements current and anticipated web standards. As of late 2015, Firefox had approximately 10–11% of worldwide usage share of web browsers, making it the 4th most-used web browser.

Firefox began as an experimental branch of the Mozilla codebase by Dave Hyatt, Joe Hewitt and Blake Ross, who believed the commercial requirements of Netscape's sponsorship and developer-driven feature creep compromised the utility of the Mozilla browser. To combat what they saw as the Mozilla Suite's software bloat, they created a stand-alone browser, with which they intended to replace the Mozilla Suite.

Firefox was originally named Phoenix but the name was changed to avoid trademark conflicts with Phoenix Technologies. The initially announced replacement, Firebird, provoked objections from the Firebird project community. The current name, Firefox, was chosen on February 9, 2004.

It was previously announced that Mozilla would launch a premium version of the Firefox browser by October 2019. The company's CEO, Chris Beard, was quoted by The Next Web: "there is no plan to charge money for things that are now free. So we will roll out a subscription service and offer a premium level." In September, Mozilla revealed their new offering, Firefox Premium Support, at $10 per installation. However, shortly after news broke of the service, Mozilla removed information about it from the website. Computerworld reported that in an email statement, Mozilla claimed "the page outlining that these paid support services for enterprise clients will be available was posted incorrectly."

In October 2023, Mozilla announced that consumer 'Firefox accounts' were renamed to 'Mozilla accounts', explicitly indicating a desire to bring the Mozilla brand into greater prominence even with the diminution of some Firefox branding:

Over the years, Firefox accounts expanded its role beyond being solely an authentication solution for Firefox Sync. It now serves as Mozilla's main authentication and account management service for a wide range of products and services, supporting millions of active account customers globally. As such, the original "Firefox" branding no longer accurately reflects the broad scope of Mozilla's offerings. The renaming is intended to create a more consistent brand experience across all Mozilla surfaces, driving higher awareness of the portfolio of Mozilla products.

As of July 2026, estimated Firefox's worldwide browser usage share declined to approximately 3.3%.

==== Firefox for mobile ====
Firefox for mobile (codenamed Fennec) is the build of the Mozilla Firefox web browser for mobile devices such as smartphones and tablet computers. Initially available on multiple platforms, it is now available in two versions: Firefox for Android and Firefox for iOS. Firefox for Android runs on the Android mobile operating system and uses the same Gecko layout engine as Mozilla Firefox; for example, version 1.0 used the same engine as Firefox 3.6, and the following release, 4.0, shared core code with Firefox 4.0. Firefox for iOS, which runs on the iOS mobile operating system, does not use the Gecko Layout Engine because of Apple's policy that all iOS apps that browse the web must use the built-in iOS WebKit rendering engine. Both version include features like HTML5 support, Firefox Sync, private browsing, web tracking protection, and tabbed browsing, and Firefox for Android also includes support for add-ons.

==== Firefox Focus ====
Firefox Focus is a free and open-source privacy-focused mobile browser for Android and iOS. Initially released in 2015 as only a tracker-blocking application for iOS, it has since been developed into a full mobile browser for both iOS and Android.

==== Firefox Lockwise ====
Firefox Lockwise was a password manager offered by Mozilla. On desktop, it was a built-in feature of the Firefox browser. On mobile, it was offered as a standalone app that could be set as the device's default password manager.

==== Firefox Monitor ====
Firefox Monitor is an online service that informs users if their email address and passwords have been leaked in data breaches.

==== Firefox Send ====
Firefox Send was an online encrypted file-transfer service offered by Mozilla. In September 2020, Mozilla announced that it would be decommissioned and would no longer be part of the product lineup.

==== Solo AI Website Creator ====
Solo is a free AI website builder for solopreneurs.

==== Tabstack ====
Tabstack is an AI developer focused infrastructure platform from Mozilla that enables automated web interaction and data extraction for AI agents and applications.

==== Mozilla VPN ====
Mozilla VPN, formerly Firefox Private Network, is a subscription-based VPN and a free privacy extension.

==== A-Frame ====
Mozilla developed A-Frame, an open-source web framework designed to simplify the creation of virtual reality (VR) and 3D experiences in web browsers. Released in 2015, A-Frame is built on top of WebGL and uses HTML-like syntax, making it accessible to web developers without requiring deep knowledge of complex 3D programming. A-Frame enables users to build immersive VR experiences that are compatible with a wide range of devices, from desktop browsers to mobile VR headsets like Oculus Rift and Google Cardboard. It also integrates with other popular web technologies, such as Three.js, to provide advanced capabilities for developers. As part of Mozilla's broader efforts in promoting the immersive web and WebXR (a standard for virtual and augmented reality experiences on the web), A-Frame has contributed to the democratization of VR development. It allows creators to develop and share VR content that is accessible directly through a web browser, removing the need for specialised software or apps. A-Frame has since grown into a widely used framework in the web development and VR communities, with contributions from developers around the world. Mozilla continues to support the project as part of its commitment to an open and immersive web.

==== Firefox Private Relay ====
Firefox Relay
- Website type: Email service provider
- Available in: English
- Creator: Mozilla
- Website: relay.firefox.com
- Registration: required
- Launched: April 9, 2020; 6 years ago
- Current status: Active
- Content license: MPL 2.0

Firefox Private Relay provides users with disposable email addresses that can be used to combat spam (by hiding the user's real email address) and manage email subscriptions by categorising them based on the party a particular address was given to.

Firefox Relay was first released as a Firefox add-on on April 9, 2020. Mozilla announced Firefox Relay Premium monthly subscription service, ending Beta version of Firefox Relay on November 19, 2021. In addition to this, users who benefit from the subscription can receive unlimited alias emails as username@username.mozmail.com as @relay.firefox.com. Instead of the pseudonymous e-mail addresses provided, @mozmail.com e-mail addresses have been switched.

==== Firefox Reality ====
In September 2018, Mozilla announced that its VR version was ready for consumers to download. Called Firefox Reality, the browser was built entirely for virtual reality. It is currently available on the Oculus.

In January 2019, HTC announced its partnership with Mozilla, under which the Firefox Reality web browser has been made available on Vive headsets.

In February 2022, Mozilla announced that Igalia had assumed stewardship of the project, whose name was changed to Wolvic. Mozilla does not support Firefox Reality anymore.

==== Firefox OS ====
Firefox OS (project name: Boot to Gecko also known as B2G) is a free software operating system developed by Mozilla to support HTML5 apps written using "open Web" technologies rather than platform-specific native APIs. The concept behind Firefox OS is that all user-accessible software will be HTML5 applications, using Open Web APIs to access the phone's hardware directly via JavaScript.

Some devices using the OS include Alcatel One Touch Fire, ZTE Open, and LG Fireweb.

Mozilla announced the end of Firefox OS development in December 2015. A fork of B2G, KaiOS, has continued development and ships with numerous low-cost devices.

=== Pocket ===
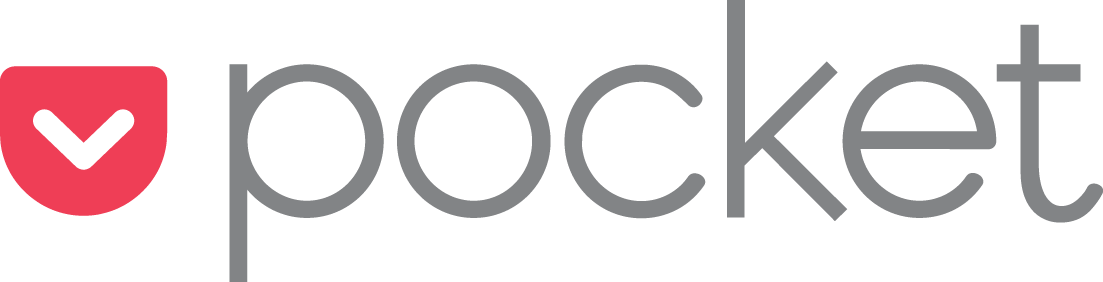
The Pocket app logo

Pocket was a mobile application and web service for managing a reading list of articles from the Internet. It was announced that it would be acquired by the Mozilla Corporation, the commercial arm of Mozilla's non-profit development group, on February 27, 2017. Originally designed only for desktop browsers, it was available for macOS, Windows, iOS, Android, Windows Phone, BlackBerry, Kobo eReaders, and web browsers. Pocket was shut down on July 8, 2025.

=== Thunderbird ===
Thunderbird is a free software, cross-platform email and news client developed by the volunteers of the Mozilla Community.

On July 16, 2012, Mitchell Baker announced that Mozilla's leadership had concluded that ongoing stability was the most important thing for Thunderbird and that innovation in Thunderbird was no longer a priority for Mozilla. In that update, Baker also suggested that Mozilla had provided a pathway for its community to innovate around Thunderbird if the community chooses.

On July 11, 2023, the Thunderbird blog announced the release of a new version of Thunderbird called Supernova. It features a new, modernised user interface, among other new features. Changes have also been made to the older underlying code structure to make "maintenance and extensibility easier".

=== SeaMonkey ===
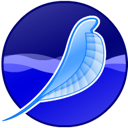
SeaMonkey logo

SeaMonkey (formerly the Mozilla Application Suite) is a free and open-source cross-platform suite of Internet software components including a web browser component, a client for sending and receiving email and Usenet newsgroup messages, an HTML editor (Mozilla Composer), and the ChatZilla IRC client.

On March 10, 2005, the Mozilla Foundation announced that it would not release any official versions of Mozilla Application Suite beyond 1.7.x, since it had now focused on the stand-alone applications Firefox and Thunderbird. SeaMonkey is now maintained by the SeaMonkey Council, which has trademarked the SeaMonkey name with help from the Mozilla Foundation. The Mozilla Foundation provides project hosting for the SeaMonkey developers.

=== Bugzilla ===
Bugzilla logo

Bugzilla is a web-based general-purpose bug tracking system, which was released as free software by Netscape Communications in 1998 along with the rest of the Mozilla codebase, and is currently stewarded by Mozilla. It has been adopted by a variety of organisations for use as a bug tracking system for both free and open-source software and proprietary projects and products, including the Mozilla Foundation, the Linux kernel, KDE, Red Hat, Eclipse and LibreOffice.

=== WebThings ===
WebThings is a framework that allowed management of IoT devices through a single framework, gateway and UI. It was based on W3C Web of Things standard. Since 2020, it is no longer affiliated with Mozilla. It was spun off as an independent project following layoffs in 2020. It was known as Project Things and allowed users to use a Raspberry Pi as a gateway for IoT management with decentralised software.

=== Components ===
==== NSS ====
Network Security Services (NSS) comprises a set of libraries designed to support cross-platform development of security-enabled client and server applications. NSS provides a complete free software implementation of crypto libraries supporting SSL and S/MIME. NSS is licensed under the GPL-compatible Mozilla Public License 2.0.

AOL, Red Hat, Sun Microsystems/Oracle Corporation, Google and other companies and individual contributors have co-developed NSS and it is used in a wide range of non-Mozilla products including Evolution, Pidgin, and LibreOffice.

==== SpiderMonkey ====
SpiderMonkey is the original JavaScript engine developed by Brendan Eich when he invented JavaScript in 1995 as a developer at Netscape. It became part of the Mozilla product family when Mozilla inherited Netscape's code base in 1998. In 2011, Eich transferred the nominal ownership of the SpiderMonkey code and project to Dave Mandelin.

SpiderMonkey is a cross-platform engine written in C++ which implements ECMAScript, a standard developed from JavaScript. It comprises an interpreter, several just-in-time compilers, a decompiler and a garbage collector. Products which embed SpiderMonkey include Firefox, Thunderbird, SeaMonkey, and many non-Mozilla applications.

==== Rhino ====
Rhino is a free software JavaScript engine. Developed entirely in Java, it converts JavaScript scripts into Java classes. It works in both compiled and interpreted mode.

==== Gecko ====
Gecko is a layout engine that supports web pages written using HTML, SVG, and MathML. Written in C++, it uses NSPR for platform independence. Its source code is licensed under the Mozilla Public License.

Firefox uses Gecko for rendering web pages and for rendering its user interface. Gecko is also used by Thunderbird, SeaMonkey, and many non-Mozilla applications.

==== Rust ====
Rust is a compiled programming language. It is designed for safety, concurrency and performance. It is intended for creating large, complex software that must be both fast and safe against exploits.

Rust is being used in an experimental layout engine, Servo, which was developed by Mozilla and Samsung. Although Servo is not yet used in any consumer-oriented browsers, the project developers plan for parts of its source code to be incrementally merged into Gecko and Firefox.

==== XULRunner ====
XULRunner is a software platform and technology experiment that allows applications built with the same technologies used by Firefox extensions (XPCOM, JavaScript, HTML, CSS, XUL) to be run natively as desktop applications, without requiring Firefox to be installed. XULRunner binaries are available for the Windows, Linux, and OS X operating systems, allowing such applications to be effectively cross-platform.

==== pdf.js ====
Pdf.js is a library that allows in-browser rendering of PDF documents using HTML5 Canvas and JavaScript. It is included by default in Firefox and Thunderbird, allowing the browser to render and edit PDF documents without requiring an external plugin. It is available separately as an extension, "PDF Viewer", for Firefox for Android, SeaMonkey, and the Firefox versions which don't include it built-in. It can also be included as part of a website's scripts, to allow PDF rendering for any browser that implements the required HTML5 features and can run JavaScript.

==== Sccache ====
sccache is a compiler caching tool, written in Rust, similar to Ccache. It acts as a compiler wrapper to avoid unnecessary compilation, storing cached results on local disks or various cloud storage backends. sccache supports caching for C/C++ code, Rust, and NVIDIA's CUDA using NVCC (compiler).

==== Shumway ====
Shumway is a free software replacement for Adobe Flash Player developed since 2012, using open web technologies as a replacement for Flash technologies. It uses JavaScript and HTML5 Canvas elements to render Flash and execute ActionScript. It is included by default in Firefox Nightly and can be installed as an extension for any recent version of Firefox. The last implementation was limited in its capabilities to render Flash content outside simple projects. The project was cancelled in 2016.

==== Servo ====
Servo is a browser engine being developed for application and embedded use. In August 2020, during the COVID-19 pandemic, due to lack of funds and organisation restructuring, Mozilla laid off most of the Servo development team. Servo then became part of the Linux Foundation, where development currently continues.

==== SOPS: Secrets OPerationS ====
SOPS is an editor of encrypted files that supports YAML, JSON, ENV, INI, and BINARY formats and encrypts with AWS KMS, GCP KMS, Azure Key Vault, age, and PGP.

==== Taskcluster ====
Taskcluster is a task execution framework supporting Mozilla's continuous integration and release processes. Initially designed for Firefox's automated builds and tests, it's a flexible, scalable open-source framework. Taskcluster is used extensively for building and releasing Firefox, Thunderbird, NSS, and other Mozilla projects.

==== WebXR Viewer ====
WebXR Viewer is an AR viewer that lets developers create and run AR experiences built with web technologies and ARKit.

== Other activities ==
Mozilla engages in social outreach about user rights on the Internet.

=== Mozilla VR ===
Mozilla VR is a team focused on bringing tools, specifications, and standards to the open Web. Mozilla VR maintains, a web framework for building VR experiences, and works on advancing WebVR support within web browsers.

On April 26, 2018, the first experiment from their Social Mixed Reality efforts was released; Hubs, a multi-user virtual space in WebVR.

Following Mozilla's restructuring in 2024, the company ceased operations for its virtual reality initiative, including Mozilla Hubs, as of May 31, 2024.

=== Mozilla Persona ===
Mozilla Persona was a secure, cross-browser website authentication mechanism that allowed a user to use a single username and password (or other authentication method) to log into multiple sites. Mozilla Persona shut down on November 30, 2016.

=== Mozilla Location Service ===
This free software crowdsourced geolocation service was started by Mozilla in 2013 and offers a free API. In March 2024, it was announced that MLS would be retired and that functionality would be reduced in stages until the project is archived in July.

=== Webmaker ===
Mozilla Webmaker is Mozilla's educational initiative, and Webmaker's goal is to "help millions of people move from using the web to making the web". As part of Mozilla's non-profit mission, Webmaker aims "to help the world increase their understanding of the web, take greater control of their online lives, and create a more web literate planet."

=== MDN Web Docs ===
Mozilla maintains a comprehensive developer documentation website called the MDN Web Docs which contains information about web technologies including HTML, CSS, SVG, JavaScript, as well as Mozilla-specific information. In addition, Mozilla publishes a large number of videos about web technologies and the development of Mozilla projects on the Air Mozilla website. This was renamed to MDN Plus.

=== Common Voice ===
In July 2017, Mozilla launched the project Common Voice to help make voice recognition open to everyone. Visitors to the website can donate their voice to help build a free software voice recognition engine that anyone can use to make apps for devices and the web that make use of voice recognition. The website allows visitors to read a sentence to help the machine system learn how real people speak, as well as validate the read sentences of other people.

Mozilla publishes Common Voice data sets under a CC-0 license.

=== IRL – Online Life Is Real Life ===
On June 26, 2017, Mozilla launched IRL – Online Life Is Real Life to explore popular stories from the web that deal with issues of the internet that affect society as a whole.

=== Mozilla Japan ===
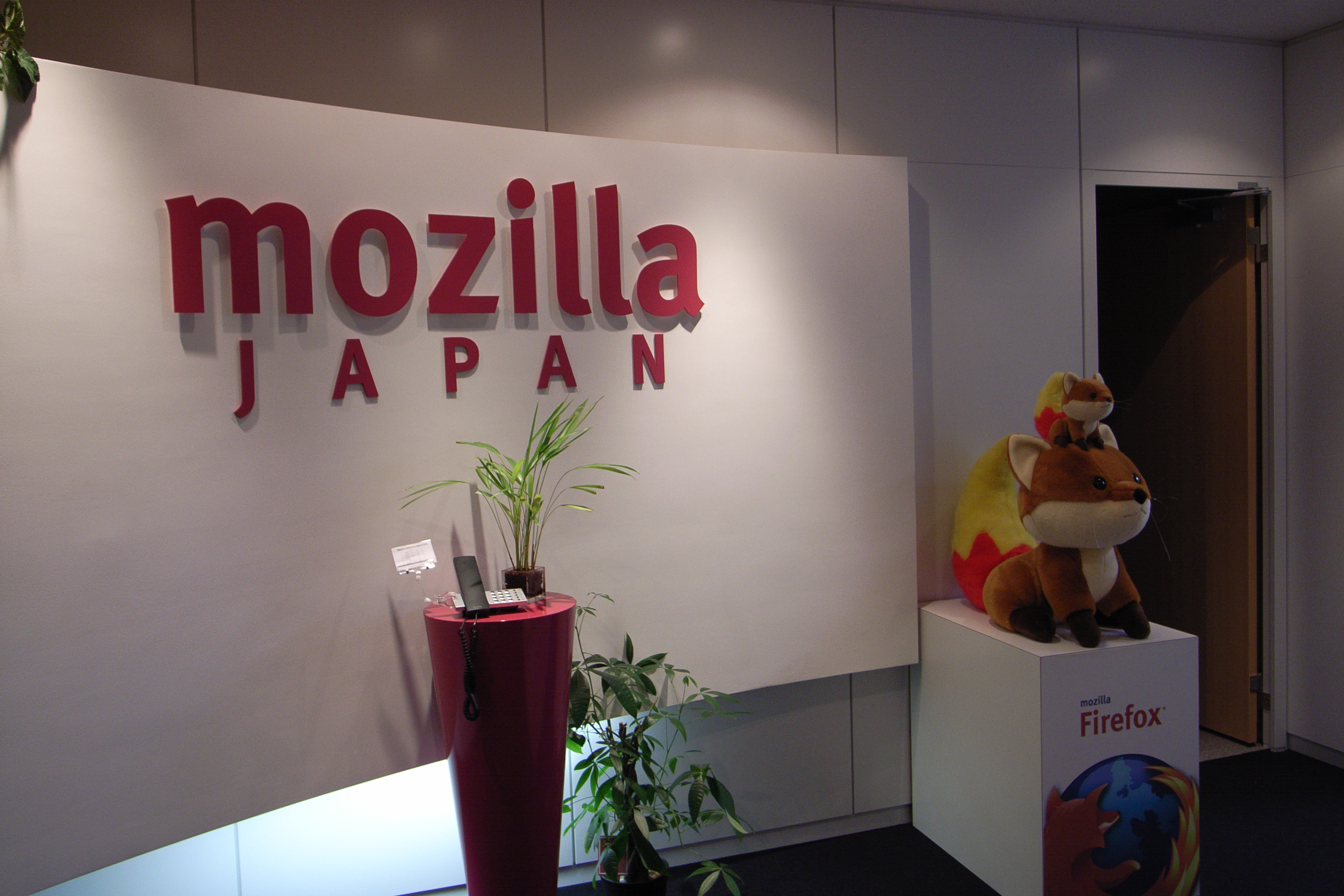
Mozilla Japan during its time at the Kojimachi GN Yasuda building.

Mozilla Japan is a limited liability organization to help promote and deploy Mozilla products in Japan. Mozilla Japan was founded on August 18, 2004. It is independent of the Mozilla Foundation, but is affiliated with them. The organization is run by its board of directors, which is made up of Hideo Aiso of the Tokyo Institute of Technology, Hideyuki Tokuda of Keio University, Nobuo Kita, Hideki Sunahara of the Nara Institute of Science and Technology, Satoko Takita (chair) and Joichi Ito of the Mozilla Foundation. As well as promoting Mozilla in Japan, the organization is also responsible for the Japanese localisation of Mozilla products, which includes translating and customizing them for a Japanese audience.

Foxkeh (フォクすけ, fokusuke) is a mascot created by Mozilla Japan to help introduce Firefox to new users in Japan. Foxkeh is a Japanese red fox with a flame for a tail – a "firefox". The name combines the English word "fox" with the suffix "suke" (すけ; 助, 輔, 介) found in some Japanese male names.

== Controversies ==
=== Directory tiles ===
In February 2014, Mozilla released Directory Tiles, which showed Firefox users advertisements based on the users' browser history, which was opt-in by default. This feature was controversial and prompted Mozilla to cancel the feature in December 2015.

=== Looking Glass Add-on ===
On December 15, 2017, Mozilla installed an add-on in all Firefox Quantum browsers, titled "Looking Glass", with the description, "MY REALITY IS JUST DIFFERENT THAN YOURS," after a collaboration of Mozilla and the television show Mr. Robot. Mozilla received some criticism, as the add-on was installed without the user's knowledge or consent. On December 18, Mozilla issued an apology for the installation of the extension and released the source code of the add-on.

=== Cliqz search engine ===
In October 2017, Mozilla launched an experimental add-on using Cliqz technology to "less than one percent of users in Germany installing Firefox". Cliqz recommended results based on the user's browser history, which drew criticism from users.

=== Push Notifications for Mozilla Blog without user consent ===
In July 2020 Mozilla forced push notifications, an advertisement for its own blog post about Facebook and Mozilla's #StopHateForProfit campaign. These notifications were sent without user consent and faced a backlash by Firefox users.

=== Federal labor charges ===
In January 2025, Mozilla settled charges from the National Labor Relations Board that the company had refused to hire #AppleToo activist and software engineer Cher Scarlett for her prior labor advocacy in 2021. They agreed to pay $300,000 in lost benefits and wages and to post a notification of rights, a promise not to retaliate, and of the settlement to employees. The charge was filed by Scarlett in 2022 and prosecuted in 2023.

=== Mozilla Monitor - OneRep Partnership ===
Mozilla Monitor partners with OneRep to issue data removal requests from online directories and data aggregators. On March 14, 2024, an investigation by Krebs on Security revealed that OneRep's founder had also founded multiple people-search companies in the past. In response, Mozilla responded in a statement to Krebs on Security "We were aware of the past affiliations with the entities named in the article and were assured they had ended before our work together. We’re now looking into this further. We will always put the privacy and security of our customers first and will provide updates as needed." Following up on their statement shortly after, Mozilla's vice president of communications told The Verge that it had ended the partnership with OneRep.

In February 2025, Krebs on Security found that Mozilla was still using and promoting OneRep.

=== Discrimination lawsuit ===
In June 2024, Steve Teixeira, who was the CPO of Mozilla Corporation, filed a lawsuit against the company. Teixeira alleges that he faced discrimination and retaliation by Mozilla after taking three months off to receive cancer treatment, and that "immediately upon his return, Mozilla campaigned to demote or terminate Mr. Teixeira, citing groundless concerns and assumptions about his capabilities as an individual living with cancer." The lawsuit was settled in December 2025.

=== NOYB complaint ===
In September 2024, NOYB filed a complaint with the Austrian data protection authority against Mozilla after the company enabled an experimental feature called "Privacy Preserving Attribution" in Firefox. The feature, designed to "allow ad performance to be measured without individual websites collecting personal data" was accused of tracking users without consent and infringing on the GDPR.

=== Terms of Use and Privacy Policy changes ===
In 2025, Mozilla received criticism after changes to the Firefox Terms of Use. The criticism was centered around a clause that gave Mozilla a "nonexclusive, royalty-free, worldwide license" to use any information that was uploaded or inputted into the browser. The new terms were perceived to reduce privacy, and were seen to be connected to AI, while Mozilla denied that these were the motives. Criticism centered on fears that the license grant covered all data inputted, while Mozilla responded saying that the change "does NOT give us ownership of your data". In an attempt to respond to the fallout, Mozilla said that many modified words were to ease readability, increase transparency, formalise existing implicit agreements, and describe the circumstances of a free browser, adding that the AI features are covered by a separate agreement. Days later, Mozilla changed the wording of their privacy FAQ, removing a pledge to never "sell your personal data" and revising another section denying allegations that it sold user data, saying that it gathers some information from hideable advertisements as well as chatbot metadata when interacted with, and that the legal definition of "sell" was vague in some jurisdictions.

== Community ==
The Mozilla Community consists of over 40,000 active contributors from across the globe. It includes both paid employees and volunteers who work towards the goals set forth in the Mozilla Manifesto. Many of the sub-communities in Mozilla have formed around localization efforts for Mozilla Firefox, and the Mozilla web properties.

=== Local communities ===
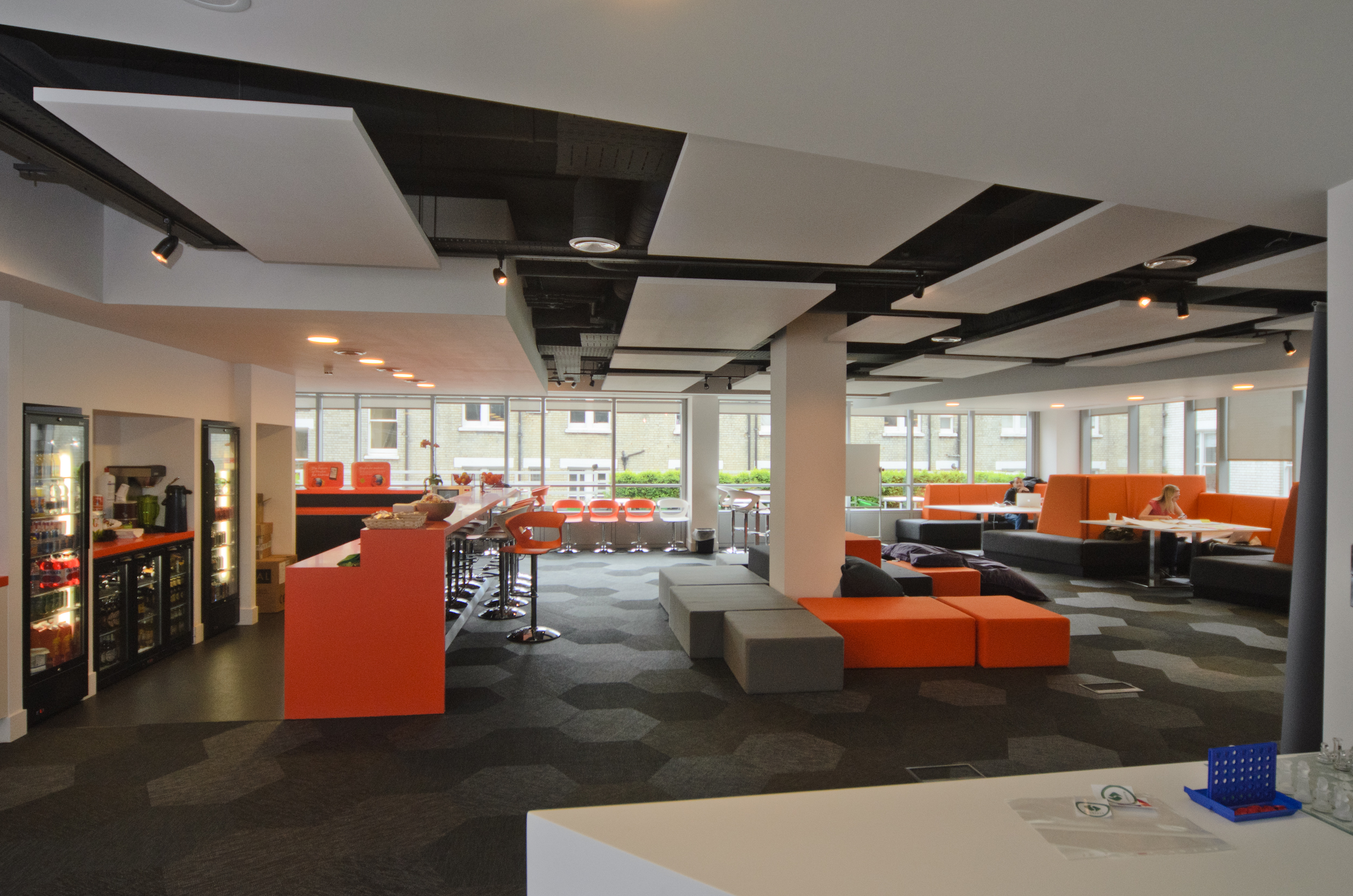
Mozilla spaces, London

Several sub-communities exist based on their geographical locations, where contributors near each other work together on particular activities, such as localization, marketing, PR, and user support.

In 2017, Mozilla created a Wireless Innovation for Network Security (WINS) challenge that awarded a total of $2 million in prize money to innovators who used its decentralised design to create wireless solutions for post-natural disaster internet access. This challenge also envisioned connecting communities that lacked internet access.

=== Mozilla Reps ===
Mozilla Reps logo

The Mozilla Reps program was a volunteer-based program that allowed volunteers to become official representatives of Mozilla. Volunteers were required to be 18 years or older to participate in the program. Activities under the program included recruitment for contributors, workshops, and attending Mozilla summits. The initiative ended in 2023.

=== Conferences and events ===
==== Mozilla Festival ====
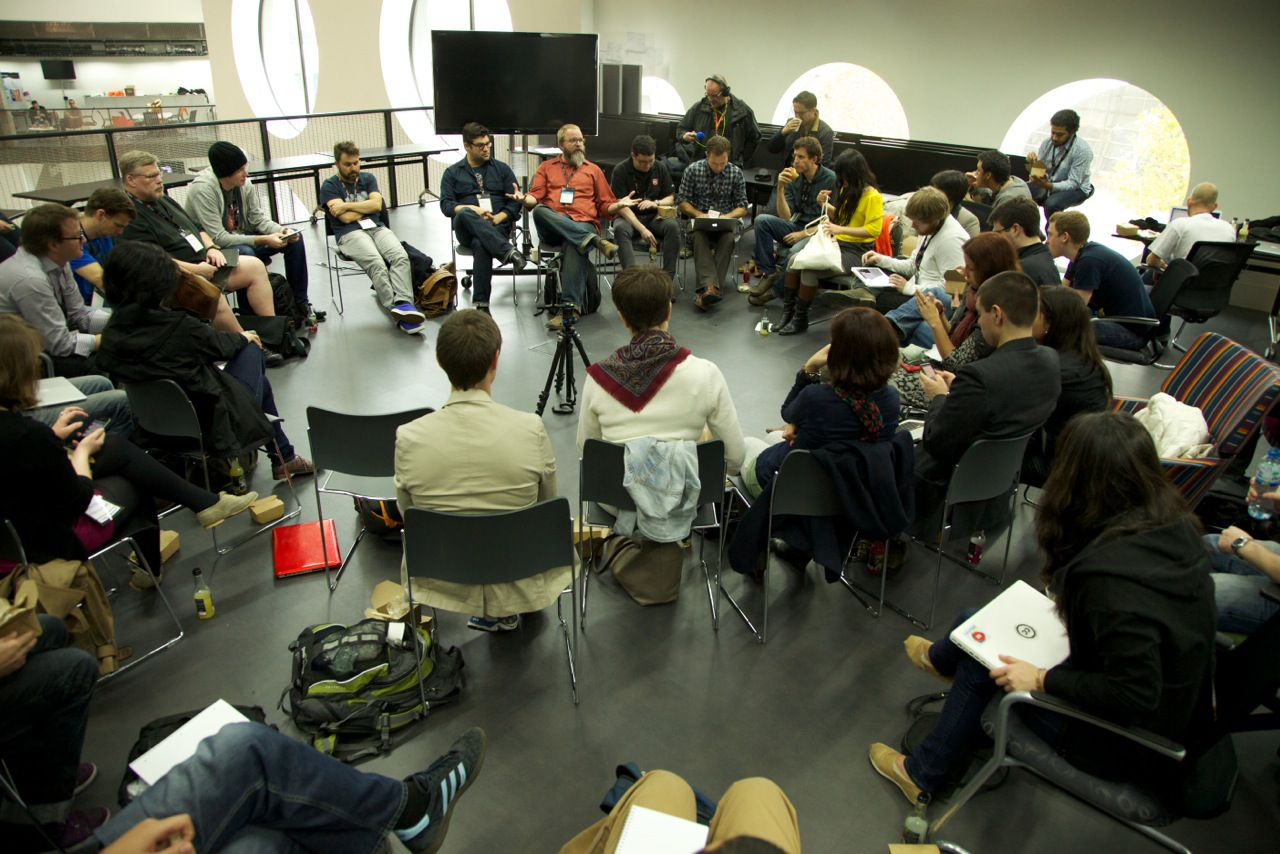
Speakers from the Knight Foundation discuss the future of news at the 2011 Mozilla Festival in London.

The Mozilla Festival (MozFest) is a unique, annual hybrid event. The event attracts a global audience that includes technologists, artists, educators, activists, and researchers. In 2021, the festival was held primarily online and attracted nearly 10,000 participants from more than 87 countries, who engaged in discussions and collaborative activities related to topics such as human rights, climate justice, and the development of trustworthy artificial intelligence.

MozFest 2025 with Francesca Bria

The event revolved around key issues based on the chosen theme for that year's festival. MozFest unfolded over the span of two weeks, with more than 500 interactive sessions, films, talks, round-tables, hack-a-thons, exhibits, and socials.

Festival topics range from privacy best practices, developing solutions to online misinformation and harassment, building free software tools, supporting Trustworthy AI innovations, and more. The titles of the festival revolve around the main theme, freedom, and the Web.

As of 2025 to 2027 festival is staged in Barcelona, Spain in collaboration with city as a multi-day event.

==== MozCamps ====
MozCamps are multi-day gatherings aimed at growing the contributor network by providing lectures, workshops, and breakout sessions led by Mozilla staff and volunteers. While these camps have been held in multiple locations globally in the past, none have occurred since 2014.

==== Mozilla Summit ====
Mozilla Summit was a global event with active contributors and Mozilla employees who collaborated to develop a shared understanding of Mozilla's mission together. Over 2,000 people representing 90 countries and 114 languages gathered in Santa Clara, Toronto, and Brussels in 2013. Mozilla had its last Summit in 2017 and replaced them with smaller All Hands gatherings, where both employees and volunteers come together to collaborate.

== See also ==
- -zilla
- List of free and open-source software organisations
- Mozilla (mascot)
- The Book of Mozilla
- Timeline of web browsers
- World Wide Web Consortium (W3C)
