= Mitchell Baker =

Chairwoman and CEO

Winifred Mitchell Baker
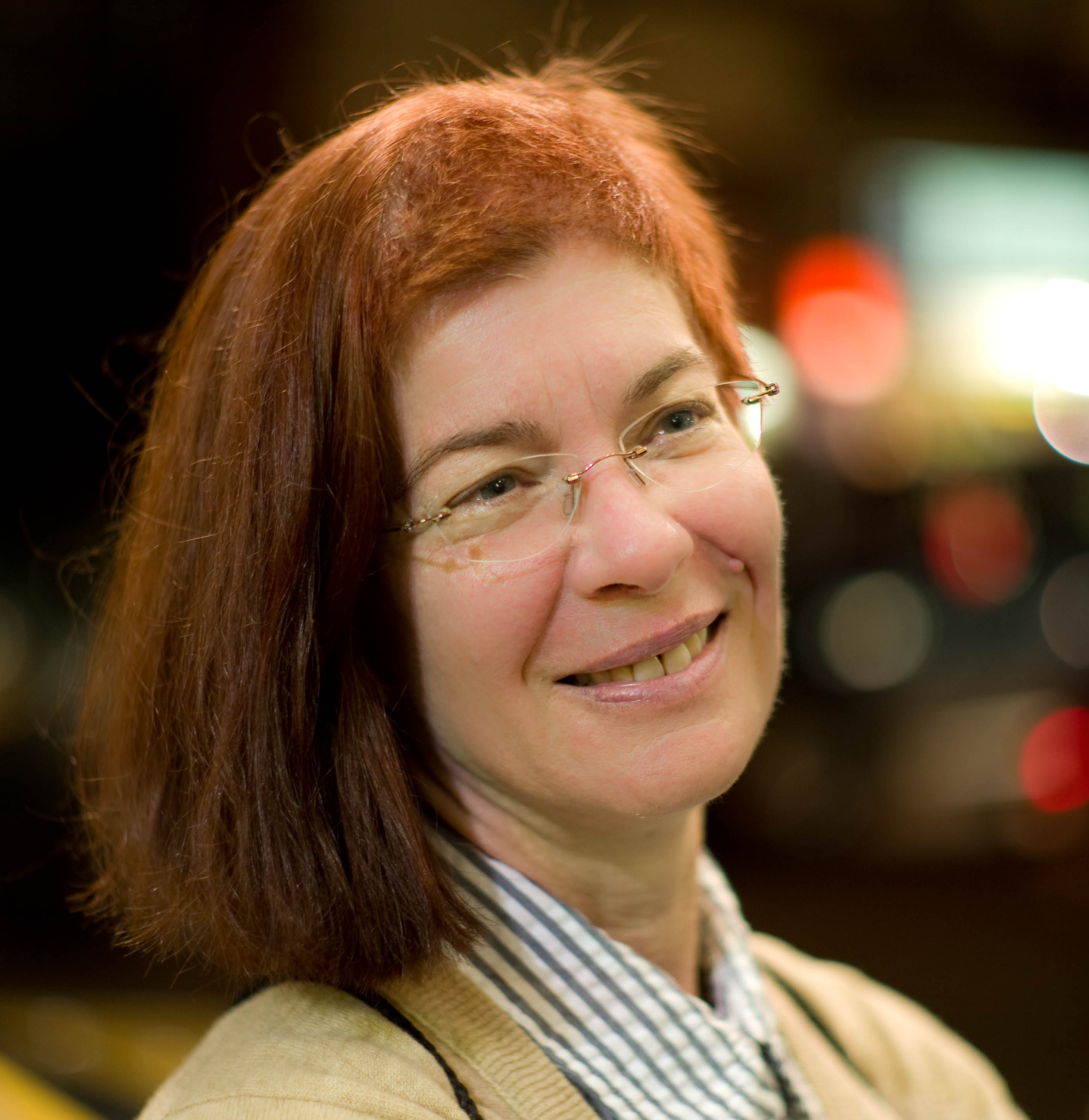
- Baker in 2009
- Born: Winifred Mitchell Baker; Berkeley, California, U.S.
- Education: University of California, Berkeley, (BA, JD)
- Title: Former Chairwoman of Mozilla Foundation; Former CEO of Mozilla Corporation
- Spouse: Casey Dunn
- Children: 1

Signature
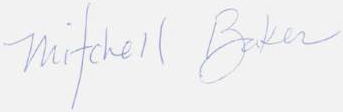

Winifred Mitchell Baker is an American businesswoman. She is a former chairwoman of the Mozilla Foundation and CEO of the Mozilla Corporation, a subsidiary of the Mozilla Foundation that coordinates development of the open source Mozilla Internet applications, including the Mozilla Firefox web browser.

Baker coordinated business and policy issues and sat on the Mozilla Foundation Board of Directors and the Mozilla Corporation Board of Directors. In 2005, Time included her in its annual list of the 100 most influential people in the world.

She stepped down as CEO in February 2024 and left Mozilla altogether in 2025.

== Education ==
Baker received a BA in Chinese studies and a certificate with distinction from the University of California, Berkeley, in 1979. She then received her JD from the UC Berkeley School of Law in 1987 and was admitted to the State Bar of California the same year.

== Career ==
From January 1990 until October 1993, she worked as a corporate and intellectual property associate at Fenwick & West LLP, a law practice specializing in providing legal services to high-technology companies. She then worked for Sun Microsystems as an associate general counsel from November 1993 until October 1994.

=== Netscape Communications Corporation and mozilla.org ===
In November 1994, Baker was hired as one of the first employees of the legal department of Netscape Communications Corporation. Reporting directly to CEO Jim Barksdale, she jointly set up the initial department. She was responsible for intellectual property protection and legal issues relating to product development, reporting to the general counsel. She also created and managed the Technology Group of the Legal Department. She was involved with the Mozilla project from the outset, writing both the Netscape Public License and the Mozilla Public License. In February 1999, Baker became the general manager of mozilla.org, the division of Netscape that coordinated the Mozilla open source project. In 2001, she was fired during a round of layoffs at America Online, then-parent of Netscape. Despite this, she continued to serve as general manager of mozilla.org on a volunteer basis.

In November 2002, Baker was employed by the Open Source Applications Foundation, helping to guide the group's community relations and taking a seat on OSAF's board of directors.

=== Mozilla Foundation and Mozilla Corporation ===
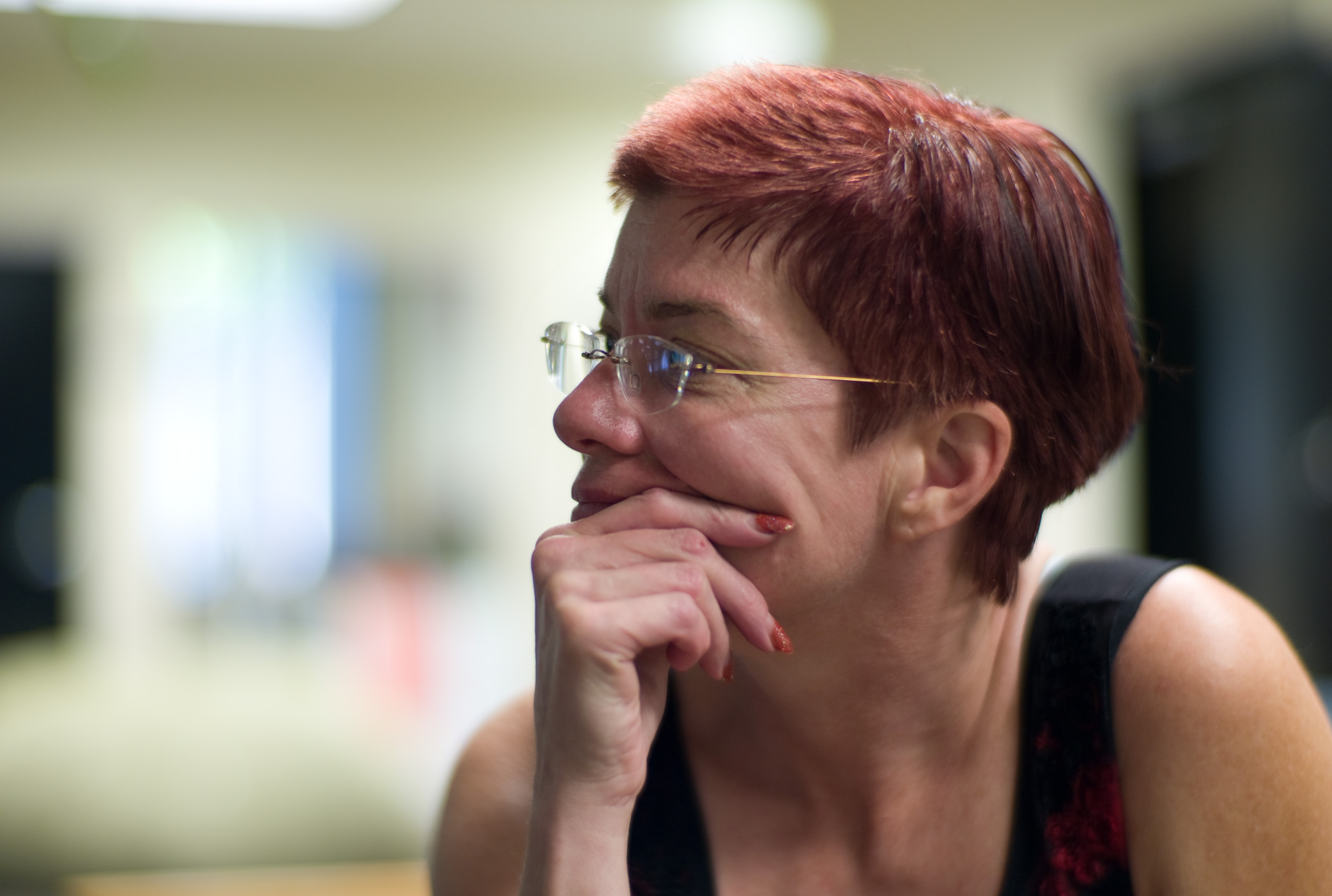
Baker in 2008

Baker telling the story of Mozilla's founding in 2012

Baker was instrumental in the creation of the Mozilla Foundation, an independent non-profit that was launched on July 15, 2003, as America Online shut down the Netscape browser division and drastically scaled back its involvement with the Mozilla project. Baker became the president of the Mozilla Foundation and was appointed to the five-person board of directors.

When the Mozilla Corporation was launched as a taxable subsidiary of the Mozilla Foundation on August 3, 2005, Baker was named the CEO of the new entity. In addition, she joined the Mozilla Corporation's board of directors, though she kept her seat on the Mozilla Foundation's board and her role as chairperson.

On January 8, 2008, Mozilla announced that Baker, while retaining her role as chairperson of the Mozilla Foundation, would no longer serve as CEO of the corporation and that MoCo's chief operating officer John Lilly would take over this role. The reasons cited for this change was Mozilla's rapid growth, which made it difficult for executives to continue to take on many different roles. In April 2020 she was named CEO of Mozilla Corporation again.

In 2018, Baker received $2,458,350 in compensation from Mozilla. In 2020, after returning to the position of CEO, Baker's salary was more than $3 million. In 2021, her salary rose again to more than $5.5 million, and again to over $6.9 million in 2022. In August 2020, the Mozilla Corporation laid off approximately 250 employees due to shrinking revenues after laying off roughly 70 employees in January 2020. Baker stated this was due to the COVID-19 pandemic, despite revenue rising to record highs in 2019, and market share shrinking.

On February 8, 2024, Mozilla announced that Baker would be stepping down as CEO to "focus on AI and internet safety" as chair of the Mozilla Foundation. She received a $6.1 million salary that year. A year later on February 19, 2025, Mozilla announced her departure from her role as Chair and member of the boards for Mozilla Foundation and Mozilla Corporation.

== Awards and recognition ==
Mitchell Baker was listed among the 2005 Top 100 by Time, in the "Scientists & Thinkers" section.

In 2009, Baker received the Anita Borg Institute Women of Vision Award for Leadership.

In 2012, Baker was inducted into the Internet Hall of Fame by the Internet Society.

== Personal life ==
Baker's husband is Casey Dunn. She has one son.

New title	CEO of Mozilla Corporation; August 3, 2005 – 2008	Succeeded by John Lilly
Preceded by Chris Beard	Interim CEO of Mozilla Corporation; December 2019 – February 2024	Incumbent
