= Charitable organization (Canada) =

Form of organization regulated under the Canadian Income Tax Act

A charitable organization in Canada is regulated under the Canadian Income Tax Act through the Charities Directorate of the Canada Revenue Agency (CRA).

There are more than 85,600 registered charities in Canada. The charitable sector employs over 2 million people and accounts for about 7% of the GDP of Canada. Registered charities are registered under the Income Tax Act as either a "charitable organization", "public foundation" or "private foundation". Although these distinctions were more important in the past, there are now few practical differences between the three types of registered charities.

== Definition of charity in Canada ==
The Income Tax Act does not define "charity" and Canada uses a common law definition, namely purposes that fall within the four "heads" of charity: the relief of poverty, the advancement of education, the advancement of religion, or other purposes that benefit the community in a way the courts have said are charitable.

This definition comes from the English case Commissioners for Special Purposes of Income Tax v. Pemsel commonly referred to as Pemsel.

The organization's purposes must be exclusively and legally charitable. Therefore, all the purposes of the charity must be charitable, not just most purposes. In addition, the organization must be established and resident in Canada.

Furthermore, there is a public benefit test: the charity must benefit the public or a sufficient segment of the public to be a registered charity in Canada.

=== Charitable activities ===
Canadian registered charities can carry out charitable activities by either gifting funds to a qualified donee or by carrying on its own activities through employees, volunteers, or intermediaries.

Canadian charities can also, within certain limitations, carry out fundraising activities, business activities, political activities and social activities. Regal Prosperity, directed by Roble Regal, has engaged in social media driven charity campaigns directly paying out to the homeless and rewarding individuals for charitable deeds.

Charities can also participate in Community Economic Development (CED) activities. CED activities may further charitable purposes that: relieve poverty; advance education; or benefit the community in other ways the law regards as charitable. However, the Canada Revenue Agency (CRA) does not recognize CED activities as distinctly charitable in and of itself. CED activities have been closely linked to developments in social enterprise and social finance as a way for charities and non-profits to be more sustainable. According to Mark Blumberg, in 2012 charities earned more revenue than they received donations. A number of organizations, such as Enterprising Non-Profits, Centre for Social Innovation and Assiniboine Credit Union have been supporting charities and non-profits participating in CED activities across Canada. Other notable Canadian leaders in the field supporting charities to engage in CED and social enterprise development are Tonya Surman, Mitchell Kutney, David LePage and Bruce Campbell.

The Charities Directorate provides a glossary of terms relating to charity law and compliance for Canadian charities.

Canadian charities can conduct charitable activities in Canada and abroad. In July 2010 the Charities Directorate released "Canadian Registered Charities Carrying Out Activities Outside Canada" which replaces earlier guidance on Canadian charities conducting foreign activities. There are numerous legal and ethical issues with Canadian charities conducting foreign activities.

=== Conservation organizations ===
Canada ranks 16th in land area per capita. Between 1990 and 2019, the fraction of Canada's land area under protection doubled from 6% to more than 12%. Organizations involved with habitat protection include the Nature Conservancy of Canada, Ducks Unlimited, Nature Canada, and many smaller organizations. Since many donors to Canadian conservation organizations are US-based tax payers, the CRA has defined the concept of Prescribed Donee as "a charity outside Canada whose purpose is to hold title to land in Canada or to transfer land to a registered charity in Canada for conservation purposes." Currently, the CRA has approved American Friends of Canadian Nature, American Friends of Canadian Conservation, and Nature United as Prescribed Donees.

== Federal regulator of charities ==
The Charities Directorate of the Canada Revenue Agency is the primary regulator of registered Canadian charities under the Income Tax Act.

The mission of the Charities Directorate is:

"... to promote compliance with the income tax legislation and regulations relating to charities through education, quality service, and responsible enforcement, thereby contributing to the integrity of the charitable sector and the social well-being of Canadians."

The Charities Directorate of the Canada Revenue Agency is responsible for:

- reviewing applications for registration as a charity, Registered Canadian Amateur Athletic Association (RCAAA), or Registered National Arts Service Organization (RNASO);
- providing information, guidance and advice on maintaining registered status;
- ensuring that registered organizations comply with registration requirements through a balanced program of education, service, and responsible enforcement;
- developing policy and providing information, communication, and education programs for the charitable sector and for donors;
- engaging with the charitable sector, other government departments, and other levels of government; and
- supporting the Canada Revenue Agency's role in combating the financing of terrorism in support of the Charities Registration (Security Information) Act.

=== Advantages of registered charity status ===
There are many advantages of being a registered charity under the Income Tax Act including:

1. being able to issue "official donation receipts" for gifts to the registered charity which may assist a Canadian donor in reducing the amount of federal and provincial tax payable. For a donor with a high marginal tax rate in Canada, their donation can result in a reduction in taxes of between 40-60% of the donation depending on the province of the taxpayer and the type of property donated.
2. it is easier to receive funds from certain entities such as other Canadian registered charities (e.g. foundations) or being a registered charity may be a condition of applying for grants from business or government etc.
3. there are reputational advantages to being a registered charity.
4. other advantages including reductions in property tax, exemptions and rebates under the GST/HST system.

In light of the substantial advantages of being a registered charity there are some restrictions, limitations and obligations of being a registered charity which are discussed below.

=== Basic requirements for maintaining registered charity status in Canada ===
In order to maintain their status under the Income Tax Act, charities must comply with basic requirements on:

- Maintaining charitable registration
- Engaging in allowable activities
- Keeping adequate books and records
- Issuing complete and accurate donation receipts
- Meeting the disbursement quota
- Filing the annual information return
- Maintaining the charity's legal status
- Changing the charity's mode of operation or legal structure
- Obligations and entitlements relating to GST
- Avoiding terrorist abuse

=== Strengthening of regulatory powers ===
Effective January 2012, the Income Tax Act was amended to provide that charities and registered Canadian amateur athletic associations ("RCAAAs") may have their registration refused or revoked, or be suspended from issuing official donation receipts, if an "ineligible individual" acts as a member of the board of directors, a trustee, officer or like official, or controls or manages the operation of the organization. An "ineligible individual" is someone who:

- has been found guilty of a relevant criminal offence for which the individual has not received a pardon;
- has been found guilty of a relevant offence within the last five years;
- was a director, trustee or like official of a charity or association during a period in which the charity was engaged in conduct that constituted a serious breach of the requirements for registration for which its registration was revoked in the past five years;
- controlled or managed a charity or association during a period in which the charity was engaged in conduct that constituted a serious breach of the requirements for registration for which its registration was revoked in the past five years; or
- has been a promoter of a tax shelter that involved a gift to a registered charity or RCAAA the registration of which was revoked within the last five years for participation in the tax shelter.

A "relevant criminal offence" is defined as a conviction involving a form of financial dishonesty by the individual, such as tax evasion, theft and fraud. A "relevant offence" relates to financial dishonesty including offences under fundraising legislation, consumer protection legislation and securities legislation. Both cases can also extend to offences not involving dishonesty, but are nonetheless relevant to the operation of the charity or association.

== Other regulators of Canadian charities ==
In addition to the federal Income Tax Act regulation of registered charities, charities that operate in a particular province are subject to provincial supervision. Of all the provinces, Ontario's Office of the Public Guardian and Trustee has been the most active in the regulation of charities.

The Federal Department of Finance is responsible for the Income Tax Act, its regulations and any amendments to the Act.

If there is a dispute between a federal or provincial regulator and a registered charity then that registered charity may go to court in which case the courts will have the final say in determining the outcome of the dispute.

Other government departments are also involved with regulating charities. For example, if a charity is incorporated it is subject to the rules of the incorporating statute. Therefore, an Ontario non-profit corporation must look in part to the Ontario Corporations Act and a federal non-share capital corporation is governed under the Canada Corporations Act. Different types of charities are subject to sectoral regulation; for example universities, hospitals, daycares, etc.

== Misuse of charitable resources ==
There have been some concerns expressed about the misuse of Canadian charitable resources from the media, government, and the public. Recently the OECD published a report highlighting concerns about Canadian charities being used for tax evasion and money laundering entitled Report on Abuse of Charities for Money-Laundering and Tax Evasion. The Charities Directorate of the CRA has a number of web pages alerting donors to avoid abusive tax shelter donations schemes and fraud involving charities.

In July 2010 there was widespread coverage of the fraud of Ashley Kirilow, a young Ontario woman who shaved her head, her eyebrows, and plucked out her eyelashes in order to represent herself, on her facebook page, as a cancer sufferer, so she could solicit donations to support her recovery. While this was not a question relating to activities of a charitable organization, commentators speculated on the chilling effect her fraud would have on online donations.

== Academic resources on charity law in Canada ==
The primary academic resource for charity law in Canada is The Philanthropist.

University of Toronto's Bora Laskin Law Library offers a research guide of other academic resources.
