= Surman =

Surman is a surname. Notable people with the surname include:

- Robert Surman (c. 1693–1759) was an English goldsmith and banker. He was associated with the South Sea Company during the period of the South Sea Bubble and later became a partner in the banking house at the Sign of the Grasshopper in Lombard Street, a predecessor of Martins Bank. He subsequently established the banking partnership Surman, Dineley and Cliffe. Surman owned Valentines Mansion in Ilford from 1724 to 1754, during which time he enlarged the estate and developed the house and grounds, now forming part of Valentines Park.
- Andrew Surman (born 1986), South African-born English footballer
- Finn Surman (born 2003), New Zealand professional footballer
- Frank Surman, (1865/1866–1925), New Zealand rugby union footballer
- Godfrey Surman (1914–1987), English cricketer
- John Surman (born 1944), English jazz musician and composer
- John Surman Carden (1771–1858), officer of the British Royal Navy in the early nineteenth century
- Kate Surman (born 1991), Australian rules footballer playing
- Les Surman, English professional footballer
- Mark Surman (born 1969), executive director of the Mozilla Foundation
- Rebecca Surman, American physicist
- Roman Surman (active since 2006), American guitarist
- Thomas Surman, professional rugby league footballer who played in the 1900s
- Tonya Surman, Canadian social entrepreneur, CEO of the Centre for Social Innovation

== Other uses ==
- Surman, Libya, coastal city in Western Libya

== See also ==
- Surma (disambiguation)
- Surmann
