= Philanthropist (disambiguation) =

A philanthropist is a person who actively promotes human welfare; a person who practices philanthropy.

Philanthropist may also refer to:

- Philanthropist (award), to recognize achievements of people with disabilities in culture and the arts
- The Philanthropist (journal), a Canadian academic journal
- The Philanthropist (play), by Christopher Hampton (1971)
- The Philanthropist (Cincinnati, Ohio), an American abolitionist newspaper
- The Philanthropist (TV series), a 2009 American action series
- National Philanthropist, a temperance newspaper edited by William Lloyd Garrison in Boston

== See also ==
- List of philanthropists
- Category:Philanthropists
