= Audubon Wildlife Theatre =

Canadian documentary television series

- Genre: Documentary
- Theme music composer: Ron Harrison
- Country of origin: Canada
- Original language: English
- No. of episodes: 78 (list of episodes)

Production
- Executive producer: Ralph C. Ellis
- Producers: Dan Gibson; Gerald Kedey
- Running time: 30 minutes
- Production companies: KEG Productions; Canadian Audubon Society

Original release
- Network: CBC
- Release: April 1968 – June 1974

Audubon Wildlife Theatre is a Canadian documentary television series that aired on CBC Television between April 13, 1968 and June 1974. The series presented wildlife footage filmed by many contributors including award winner Dan Gibson and others such as Jack Carey, Wilf Gray, Edgar Jones, William Jahoda, John D. Bulger and Walter Berlet.
