= Kutney =

Kutney is a surname. Notable people with the surname include:

- Jason Kutney (born 1981), American soccer player
- Mitchell Kutney (born 1985), Canadian entrepreneur

== See also ==
- Kitney (disambiguation)
