= Shirley Ngozi Okwudinma =

- Her Majesty Ugoeze
- Consort: Queen Shirley, Ugoeze of Nneato Obibi-Ochasi, Orlu local government area of Imo State, Nigeria
- Spouse: His Royal Highness, Eze Samson Okwudinma, Igwe Ohazurume 1 of Nneato Obibi-Ochasi
- Occupation: Entrepreneur

Shirley Ngozi Okwuadinma is a Nigerian entrepreneur and philanthropist. She is a royal mother from Nneato Obibi-Ochasi, Orlu autonomous community of Imo State, Nigeria. She is popularly addressed as Her Royal Majesty, Queen, Ugoeze Shirley Ngozi Okwudinma, being the wife of a traditional ruler in Imo State, Nigeria. She is the Chairperson of Ugoezes in Imo State.

== Early life and education ==
Ugoeze Shirley is from Nneato Obibi -Ochasi Kingdom in Orlu local government area of Imo state, Nigeria. She is married to His Royal Highness (HRH) Eze Samson Okwudinma. They have four children (2male and 2female). Ugoeze has a Bachelor in Education in English from the University of Nigeria Nsukka. She also has an Honorary Doctorate Degree from the Global Harvest Christian University (Doctor of Humanities). Ugoeze lost her mother-in-law, Late Mrs Ezinne Lolo Virginia Otimkpu Okwudinma. She died at the age of 95.

== Career ==
Ugoze Shirley is the Chief Executive Officer of Shirley Supremo Finishings Limited. She is known for her "strong advocacy for institutionalizing Igbo culture in the diaspora, and personal brand in the Africa's furniture and finishing industry."

=== Activities ===
Cultural heritage

Queen Shirley Ngozi Okwudinma was at the Igbo New Yam Festival in Ghana. In her speech, she stated, "Our culture and traditions are our unique identity. We need to safeguard and promote them, as they can attract tourists from across the globe."

In April 2025, Ugoeze Shirley attended the official launch of Igbo literary work titled “Ilulu Na Akpaalaokwu Igbo” at Mbaise in Imo state. She attended as the "Mother of the Day," for preserving and promoting the rich heritage of the Igbo nation.

Ugoeze Shirley celebrated alongside her husband, His Royal Majesty Eze Samson Okwudinma and the entire community on the Iriji (New Yam) ceremony.

When the Royal Mothers and the wives of traditional rulers in Imo State met at the Eze Imo Palace, Mbari Cultural Center Owerri in July 9, 2021, Ugoeze was with them. The Royal Mothers "joined voices and hearts to pray as one, for the sustenance of peace and the well-being of Imo state and the nation in general." During the event, Ugoeze Shirley "acknowledged the efforts of the royal mothers in organizing the prayer summit to help redeem Imo." She also "prayed for the peaceful repose of the souls of all the innocent persons who lost their lives during the inglorious days. She expressed optimism that God will answer the royal prayers by cleansing and healing the land for good."

Women of honour (WOH)

Ugoeze leads a non-governmental organization called, Women of Honour Association. In the Christmas of 2025, the association organized an outreach program, giving out several food stuff to some indigent members of the society. This took place at the Odenigbo Pavilion, Assumpta Catholic Church, Imo state.

== Awards and honours ==
Award for "Most Prolific Philanthropist of The Year." Ugoeze Shirley was given an award by Arise Africa Magazine for selfless services to the communities and outstanding performance in her chosen career. According to Arise Africa Magazine, "she is very committed to the ideals of philanthropy and has kept bringing lots of smiles and succor to people all around her."

She also received, "Humanitarian Award by Rotary Club International in 2024."
