= List of Audubon Wildlife Theatre episodes =

Audubon Wildlife Theatre was a wildlife documentary television series broadcast from 1968 to 1973.

== Season 1: 1968 ==
39 episodes

No.	Title	Original release date
1	"Land of the Loon"	April 13, 1968
Canadian Film Awards - best film for TV. Filmed in Ontario's Algonquin Park by Dan Gibson.
2	"The Vanishing Sea"	April 20, 1968
The wildlife of Utah's Great basin
3	"From the Mountains to the Sea"	April 27, 1968
4	"River of Grass."	May 4, 1968
The wildlife of the Florida Everglades, filmed by Robert Hermes.
5	"Wildlife Island"	May 11, 1968
A wildlife sanctuary and an outdoor science school on Toronto's Harbour islands.
6	"Sea, Ice and Fire"	May 18, 1968
The wildlife, volcanoes and people of Iceland, filmed by Sewall Pettingill.
7	"They Live by the Water"	May 25, 1968
The microscopic organisms in and around freshwater ponds near Burlington, Ontario.
8	"Land of the Sea"	June 1, 1968
The spruce and hemlock forests along a small stream in Nova Scotia that flows into Minas Basin where the tides of the Bay of Fundy are filmed in time lapse. Filmed by Robert C. Hermes.
9	"Scandinavian Saga"	June 8, 1968
The wildlife of Denmark, Sweden, Norway and Iceland. Stork, bear, Reindeer and lynx featured.
10	"Wildlife Sanctuaries of India"	June 15, 1968
The Gir Forest of India, filmed by Jack Carey.
11	"Between the Tides"	June 22, 1968
The creatures of the sea and land filmed and narrated by Robert Hermes.
12	"Adventure High Arctic"	June 29, 1968
Ed Jones documents the impact of the Arctic on wildlife and his family.
13	"Venezuelan Prairie"	July 6, 1968
The wildlife of central Venezuela
14	"These Things are Ours"	July 13, 1968
Animals and events that are common, but rarely noticed.
16	"Alberta Outdoors"	October 26, 1969
17	"Nature's Ways"	July 27, 1968
18	"Kenya and Uganda"	August 3, 1968
Wildlife of Kenya and Uganda
19	"New England Saga"	August 10, 1968
New England's hills, valleys and sea coasts
20	"The Living Wilderness"	August 17, 1968
Close-ups of moose, elk, bighorn, crizzly, marmot and birds of in the Western U.S.
21	"Land of the Drowned River"	August 31, 1968
Maryland's Delmarva Peninsula
22	"Delta of the Orinoco"	September 7, 1968
The virgin rain forest around Venezuela's Orinoco River
23	"Red Deer Valley"	September 14, 1968
The wildlife of central Alberta
24	"Northwest to Alaska"	September 21, 1968
Four Seasons in Alaska filmed by Walter Bertlett.
25	"World of Bees"	September 28, 1968
Inside a bee hive, showing the life cycle of bees and a battle to the death between to queens. Filmed by Jack Carey.
26	"Waterfowl Wilderness"	October 5, 1968
Life cycle of Mallard Duck is filmed by Dan Gibson.
27	"Desert Life"	October 12, 1968
28	"Hawaii"	November 2, 1968
Wildlife of the Hawaiian Islands filmed by Walter and Myrna Berlet
29	"Queen of the Cascades"	June 21, 1969
Wildlife of Mount Rainier of the Cascades Range
30	"This England"	June 28, 1969
England's game preserves
31	"Promise of Spring"	July 5, 1969
Springtime in inland British Columbia filmed and narrated by Wilf Gray.
32	"Down South Up the Nile"	July 12, 1969
33	"Wild Lands, Our Heritage"	July 19, 1969
Film maker Dan Gibson makes a special plea for Canadians to be conservationists.
34	"Wildlife by Air"	July 26, 1969
A visit to the Bahamas with pilot and photographer Herman Kitchen.
35	"Living Jungle"	August 2, 1969
36	"Where Eagles Swim"	August 9, 1969
Bald Eagles of British Columbia's northern coast
37	"Return to Pelican Island"	August 16, 1969
Pelicans nest and raise their young on islands off the U.S. Pacific Coast. Filmed and narrated by Robert Davidson.
38	"Soliloquy for a River"	August 23, 1969
The interdependence of wildlife and a Midwestern river. Filmed by Robert Davidson.
39	"Wildfowl Sanctuary"	August 30, 1969
The Kortright Waterfowl Park in Guelph. Filmed and narrated by William H. Carrack.

== Season 2: 1971 ==
A 12-week series

No.	Title	Original release date
1	"Land of Oriskany"	January 3, 1971
2	"Spring Marsh"	January 10, 1971
3	"Mexico, Land of Contrast"	January 17, 1971
The lives, crafts and celebrations of the people of Mexico.
4	"Insect World"	January 24, 1971
5	"Living Mountains"	January 31, 1971
Living Mountains
6	"Beaver Pond"	February 7, 1971
7	"Costa Rica"	February 14, 1971
8	"Enduring Wilderness"	February 21, 1971
Baja California area of Mexico filmed by Chess Lyons
9	"Sounds of Nature"	February 28, 1971
The sounds of wildlife, including birds, bears and beavers.
10	"Awareness for Tomorrow"	March 7, 1971
Toronto Island Natural Science School
11	"River Run"	March 14, 1971
Rafting the Colorado River through the Grand Canyon.
12	"Coral World of Bermuda"	March 21, 1971
13	"Small World"	April 4, 1971
Insects
14	"Mule Deer Country"	April 18, 1971
15	"Around the Bay"	April 25, 1971
Wildlife of Delaware Bay
16	"Ants and Aphids"	May 2, 1971
Growths on plants are homes for developing insects. Produced by Fran Hall of Minnesota.
17	"Africa's Curious Naturalists"	May 9, 1971
18	"Rattlesnake King"	May 23, 1971
Frank Young, the Rattlesnake King of New Hampshire
15	"High Country"	May 30, 1971
Alberta from the Rockies to the Prairies filmed by Chess Lyons.
19	"Color It Living"	June 5, 1971
Portrait of artist Glen Loates, painter of North American wildlife
20	"Land of the Totem Pole"	June 13, 1971
Wildlife of British Columbia's Queen Charlotte Islands filmed by renowned ecologist J. Bristol Foster.
21	"Africa, Cornerstone for Survival"	June 27, 1971
Ecologist Bristol Foster, Ph. D on the need for wildlife to adapt to a changing world.

== Season 3: 1972 ==
No.	Title	Original release date
1	"Kangaroos and Koalas"	January 2, 1972
2	"Wapiti"	January 9, 1972
3	"Lands of Two Oceans"	January 30, 1972
Differences between the Pacific Rim and Gaspé region.
4	"Water Birds of Australia"	February 6, 1972
5	"Land of Igloolik"	February 13, 1972
6	"Lobster Country"	February 20, 1972
East coast of North America
7	"Micronesia"	February 27, 1972
8	"Quebec Spring"	March 5, 1972
9	"West Side Journey"	March 12, 1972
10	"New England Wilderness"	March 19, 1972
11	"Quebec-Iran Adventure"	April 2, 1972
12	"Reptiles - A Misunderstood Species"	April 16, 1972
13	"Wanderings of a Naturalist"	April 23, 1972
Gerald Pollock films wildlife in Australia and New Zealand, including Kiwi, Emu, Eyre Bird, Bower Bird and Compass Termites.
14	"Family in the Wilderness"	April 30, 1972
15	"Nesting Time in Southern Ontario"	May 7, 1972
The beginning of nesting time for different bird species in Southern Ontario
16	"Coyote Country"	May 14, 1972
A mother Coyote raises her pups in the Utah wilderness.
TBA	"Day In The Desert"	August 27, 1972
TBA	"Untamed Olympics"	September 10, 1972
TBA	"Bermuda; Land and Sea"	January 3, 1973
