= Surma =

Surma may refer to:

- Surma (Finnish mythology), a beast which guards the gates of the Underworld
- Surma people, a pastoralist ethnic group in western Ethiopia
- Surma (woreda), a district in the Southern Nations, Nationalities, and Peoples' Region, Ethiopia
- Surma River, a river in Sylhet, Bangladesh
- Surma, Nepal
- Surma, Tripura, an assembly constituency within the Tripura East Lok Sabha constituency, India
- Kohl (cosmetics), an eyelash dye and eye cosmetic
- Surma-horn, a Ukrainian musical instrument
- Soorma (film), 2018 Indian film by Shaad Ali, based on the life of hockey player Sandeep Singh
- Surma (Finnish band), a Finnish metal band
- Surma (Czech band), a Czech symphonic metal band

== Persons ==
- Surma D'Bait Mar Shimun (1883–1975), Assyrian leader
- Damian Surma (born 1981), Canadian ice hockey player
- John P. Surma (born 1954), American businessman
- Franciszek Surma (1916–1941), Polish pilot in World War II
- Łukasz Surma (born 1977), Polish footballer

== See also ==
- Soorma (film), a 2018 Indian field hockey film
- Soorma Bhopali (Sholay), a fictional character played by Jagdeep in the 1975 classic Indian film Sholay
- Soorma Bhopali, a 1988 Indian film directed by Jagdeep
