= Motus (wildlife tracking network) =

Wildlife tracking network

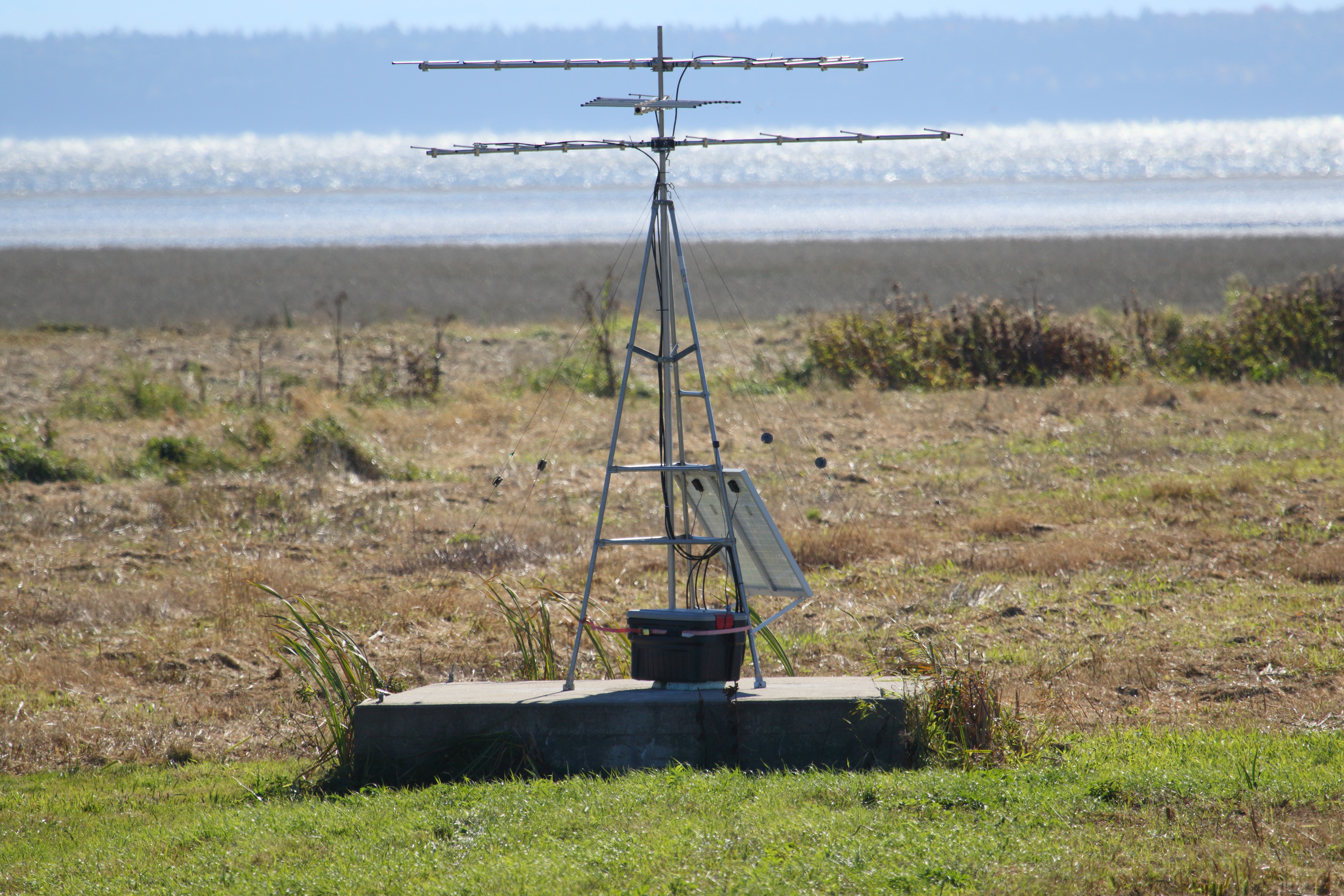
A receiving antenna in Cape Tourmente National Wildlife Area in Canada.

Motus (Latin for movement) is a network of radio receivers for tracking signals from transmitters attached to wild animals. Motus uses radio telemetry for real-time tracking. It was launched by Birds Canada in 2014 in the US and Canada.

As of 2022, more than 1,500 receiver stations had been installed in 34 countries. Most receivers are concentrated in the United States and Canada, where the network began. The network has spread rapidly because it provides important key data useful to researchers and conservationists, both nationally and internationally.

The Motus transmitter's great advantage is its small size and weight. Transmitters weigh 0.2 to 2.6 grams (0.0071 to 0.0917 oz), and can therefore be attached to all animals, even insects such as bee or butterfly.

Once a researcher or organization receives state and federal permits, they only need to acquire the appropriate transmitters and attach them to their study objects. Current transmitters' range is up to 12 miles (20 kilometers).

The long-used geolocators and GPS loggers are light and small but only store the desired data; they cannot wirelessly transmit the data. This means that researchers must recapture the transmitter-equipped animal to read the stored information, which can take a long time, and many times is unsuccessful.

Depending on the animal to be tracked, the transmitter is attached either with a thread or an adhesive. After a certain time the glue or thread dissolves and the transmitter falls off, in the meantime having transmitted all the data to the receivers it passed.

== See also ==
- ICARUS Initiative
