= Birds Canada =

Organization in Southern Ontario, Canada

Coordinates: 42.619181°N 80.456657°W

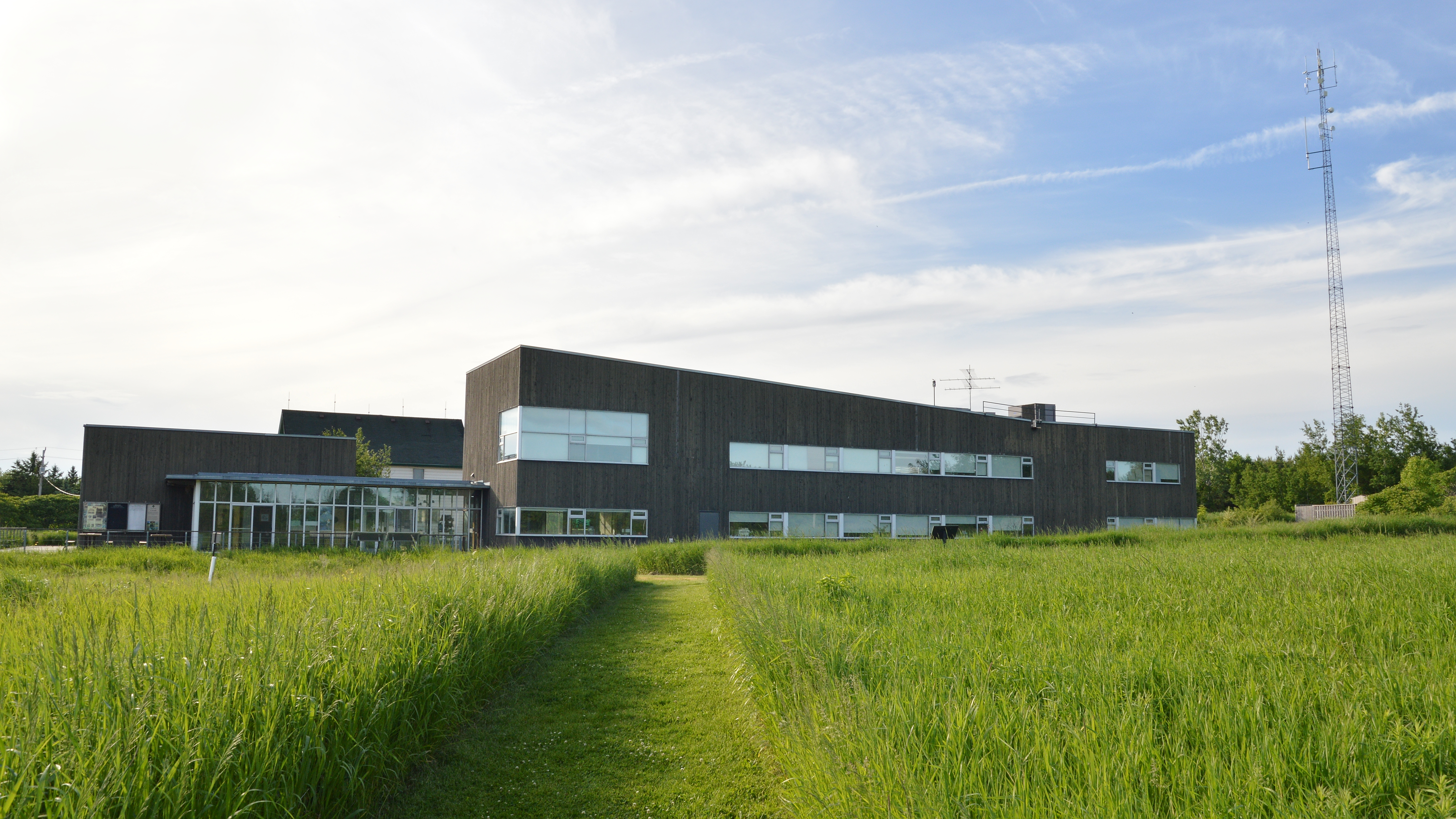
Birds Canada headquarters

Birds Canada (French: Oiseaux Canada), formerly Bird Studies Canada, is a Canadian non-profit organization dedicated to bird conservation, scientific research, and public participation in bird monitoring. Founded in 1960 as the Long Point Bird Observatory, the organization operates national and international conservation programs, including bird population monitoring, habitat research, and the Motus (wildlife tracking network). Its headquarters are located in Port Rowan, Ontario, near Long Point on Lake Erie.

The organization engages volunteers, researchers, government agencies, and conservation partners in collecting and analyzing information about wild birds and their habitats.

== History ==
=== Long Point Bird Observatory ===
Birds Canada traces its origins to the establishment of the Long Point Bird Observatory (LPBO) in 1960. Founded by volunteers in southern Ontario, the observatory was created to study bird migration and population trends along Long Point, a peninsula extending into Lake Erie.

The observatory established a long-term bird monitoring program involving daily counts, bird banding, and field research. It operates three research stations on Long Point and maintains historical datasets used to study changes in migratory bird populations.

=== Expansion into a national organization ===
As its scientific and conservation activities expanded beyond the Long Point region, the organization adopted the name Bird Studies Canada in 1998 to reflect the national scope of its work. It subsequently adopted the name Birds Canada in 2019.

The organization expanded its participation in bird monitoring and conservation projects across Canada, working with volunteers, universities, government agencies, and other conservation organizations.

== Conservation and research programs ==
Birds Canada operates and coordinates scientific research and conservation programs addressing bird population trends, migratory movements, breeding success, and habitat protection. Many of its projects use citizen science methods, allowing volunteers to collect observations that contribute to scientific research and conservation planning.

=== Long Point Bird Observatory ===
The Long Point Bird Observatory remains one of Birds Canada's principal research programs. Its research stations conduct migration monitoring through bird banding, daily observation, and standardized counts. The resulting long-term records are used to study migration patterns and changes in bird populations.

The observatory also supports education, research collaboration, and training for students and volunteer bird monitors.

=== Long Point Waterfowl and Wetlands Research Program ===
Birds Canada operates the Long Point Waterfowl and Wetlands Research Program, which conducts applied research on waterfowl, other waterbirds, and wetland habitats in the Great Lakes region. The program investigates conservation and management questions affecting wetland ecosystems, including habitat conditions, environmental pressures, and waterbird populations.

The program also provides practical field training and research opportunities for students, wildlife technicians, biologists, and other conservation professionals.

=== Motus Wildlife Tracking System ===
The Motus (wildlife tracking network) is an international research network that uses automated radio telemetry to track the movements of birds, bats, and insects. Launched in 2014 through a collaboration involving Birds Canada, Western University, Acadia University, the University of Guelph, and other partners, the system uses a network of receiving stations to detect animals carrying small radio transmitters.

By May 2025, the network had expanded to more than 2,150 active receiving stations in 34 countries and had tracked more than 55,000 animals representing over 400 species. The resulting data are used to study migration routes, habitat use, and animal movement across large geographic areas.

The project has also received research infrastructure support through Canada's advanced research and education network, CANARIE.

=== Canadian Lakes Loon Survey ===
The Canadian Lakes Loon Survey is a volunteer-based monitoring program operated by Birds Canada that studies the reproductive success of common loons. Monitoring began in Ontario in 1981 and expanded across Canada in 1991.

Participants record observations of loon pairs, nests, and chicks during the breeding season. These data are used to assess reproductive trends and inform conservation activities affecting lakes and aquatic habitats.

== Scientific data and conservation partnerships ==
Birds Canada develops and maintains scientific data resources used by researchers and conservation organizations. Its NatureCounts platform supports the collection, management, interpretation, and sharing of bird monitoring data.

The organization has participated in national assessments of bird populations, including The State of Canada's Birds 2019, produced through the North American Bird Conservation Initiative in Canada in collaboration with Environment and Climate Change Canada, Nature Canada, and Ducks Unlimited Canada.

== Headquarters ==
Birds Canada's national headquarters are located at 115 Front Road in Port Rowan, Ontario, near the Long Point peninsula. The property includes visitor facilities, educational displays, walking trails, and access to local birdwatching areas.

== See also ==
- BirdLife International
- Nature Canada
- Long Point Bird Observatory
- Long Point National Wildlife Area
- Bird conservation
- Motus wildlife tracking network
