= Władysław Gnyś =

Polish flying ace

- Born: 24 August 1910; Sarnów, Russian Empire
- Died: 28 February 2000; Beamsville, Canada
- Burial place: Mount Osborn Cemetery
- Military career
- Branch: Polish Air Force; French Air Force; Royal Air Force
- Service number: P-1298
- Units: 121st Fighter Escadrille; No. 302 Polish Fighter Squadron; No. 309 Polish Fighter-Reconnaissance Squadron; No. 316 Polish Fighter Squadron; No. 317 Polish Fighter Squadron
- Awards

Władysław Gnyś (24 August 1910 – 28 February 2000) was a Polish pilot of the Polish Air Force, a World War II flying ace and the first Polish and allied victor in aerial combat in World War II. He briefly served as the commander of No. 317 Polish Fighter Squadron; he was shot down on his first mission over France on August 27, 1944.

In 1931, Gnyś entered military service with the Polish Air Force. In 1933 he began air training in Grudziądz and later in 1936, was a flying instructor at the Polish Air Force Academy at Dęblin. During the war he scored six victories - three solo and three shared - in the Polish and French campaigns.

== The defense of Poland, September 1939 ==
By May 1939 Gnyś had been posted to the 121st Eskadra Mysliwska (121st Fighter Escadrille) in the city of Kraków, equipped with obsolete PZL P.11c fighters. On 31 August the Squadron was assigned to operate with the III/2 Dywizjon (Group) and it relocated to a reserve airfield in Balice.

In the early morning of 1 September 1939, Gnyś was woken by a German bombing raid on Kraków. At about 6.30 am Gnyś flew a sortie with Cpt Mieczyslaw Medwecki, the Group Commander. Just after takeoff and at about 300 meters altitude the Polish fighters were surprised by a pair of German Ju 87B dive-bombers from I/StG 2 "Immelmann", heading home after bombing main Kraków Rakowice airfield. Unteroffizier Frank Neubert successfully fired at Medwecki and scored probably the first aerial victory of the war. The P-11 fell away having suffered serious damage, and Medwecki was killed. Gnyś avoided attack with a sharp left turn. A few minutes later Gnyś noticed a pair of Do 17E bombers from KG 77 heading towards Olkusz, and started a low-level chase, firing at one of bombers and avoiding inefficient fire of a rear gunner. Both Do 17 bombers eventually crashed in the country village of Żurada, south of Olkusz. One of the German bombers was coded "3Z+FR" on its fuselage and all six crew members were killed, one later identified as a Uffz. Klose. On his return to base Gnyś also reported firing at a lone He 111 from a distance, but he ran out of ammunition. Shooting down of two Do 17 bombers was the first Allied aerial victory in the war. Fallen bombers were however misidentified by Polish authorities as Heinkel He 111, and Gnyś was officially credited with shooting down one "He 111", while the other was credited to an "unknown" pilot.

There was a controversy regarding these victories. According to Marius Emmerling, based on German wartime sources two Do 17Es from 7./KG 77 did crash near Żurada, but this was caused by a Polish anti-aircraft artillery, which damaged one Do 17 which then collided with the other. However, according to a research by a historian Jerzy Cynk, in a wartime report Gnyś described in detail chasing two bombers with twin tailfins (Do 17) heading towards Olkusz, and firing at one of them at a low altitude, what was also confirmed by witnesses in Żurada examined already the same day. After a maneuver, Gnyś lost bombers from a sight, however he saw something smoking on a ground. Therefore, according to Cynk, there is no doubt, that Gnyś was responsible for destroying both bombers, even if one of them crashed into the other in a process. The controversy was strengthened by the fact, that Gnyś in his later memoirs started to claim, that he also fired at, or eventually even shoot down a Ju 87 after Medwecki's death. According to Cynk, there is no proof for that, and the Stuka unit had no losses, and this one postwar claim is false.

Gnyś scored another victory in September 1939, claiming a He 111.

== France 1940 ==
After the fall of Poland, Gnyś fled to France and served as a pilot with the French Air Force. Flying the Morane MS 406-C with GC III./1 and stationed at Toul Croix, Gnyś scored three shared victories; a He 111 on 12 May and two Do 17s on 16 May. After the French surrender, Gnyś escaped via Oran and Casablanca and arrived in Liverpool on 14 July 1940.

== With the RAF 1940-44 ==
Gnyś later fought with the Royal Air Force, joining No. 302 Squadron as a Pilot Officer on 17 August 1940 and seeing combat in the Battle of Britain and into 1941. On 21 May 1941 Gnyś' Hawker Hurricane was badly damaged by fighters although he managed to return to base.

Later he served with the No. 316 Polish Fighter Squadron flying Spitfires and No. 309 Polish Fighter-Reconnaissance Squadron, flying tactical reconnaissance Mustangs.

On 22 August 1944, he was appointed to the command of No. 317 Polish Fighter Squadron. Two days later, Gnyś was shot down over Rouen by flak, was wounded and captured by German forces. Despite his wounds, he escaped from a POW field hospital a few days later, found by the French Maquis and returned to the Allied lines safely.

He settled in Canada after the war.

== Awards ==
Croix de Guerre (France)
Distinguished Flying Cross (United Kingdom)
Cross of Valour (Poland) 3 times
Silver Cross of the Order of Virtuti Militari
Commander's Cross with Star of the Order of Polonia Restituta (2 September 1999)
Bronze Cross of Merit (18 June 1935)
