= Surmann =

Surmann is a German surname. Notable people with the surname include:

- Hartmut Surmann (born 1963), German electric technician and information scientist
- Mathias Surmann (born 1974), German football player

== See also ==
- Surman
