= JustChange =

Canadian-based giving circle

- Website: www.justchange.ca

JustChange is a local giving circle of philanthropists that provides small grants for "initiatives proposed by individuals or organizations that produce positive outcomes for the community whether from a social, environmental or economic (equity and equality) perspective." JustChange uses a board crowd-funding model and awards $1,000 grant bimonthly to a project and person.

== History ==
The 11 member group from Ottawa came together with the plan to pool together funds every month and donate it to a person, group or organization in Ottawa with a good idea that will have a positive social, economic or environmental impact on the city. The first call for ideas was launched in November 2012. Past recipients include Sisters Achieving Excellence, a literacy program for at-risk women; EcoEquitable, and their project, bumbrella, which converts lost umbrellas into bicycle seat covers; and BibzGame, a program that gives young women training in website building and game development.

== Board members ==
The JustChange board members include: Mitchell Kutney, Louis Zuniga, Jesse Cressman-Dickinson, Alex Carr, Kasia Polanska, Ivy So, Davis Carr, Albert Thibodeau, Read Guernsey, Joshua Gillmore and Brittany Fritsch.
