= Mark Surman =

Canadian internet activist

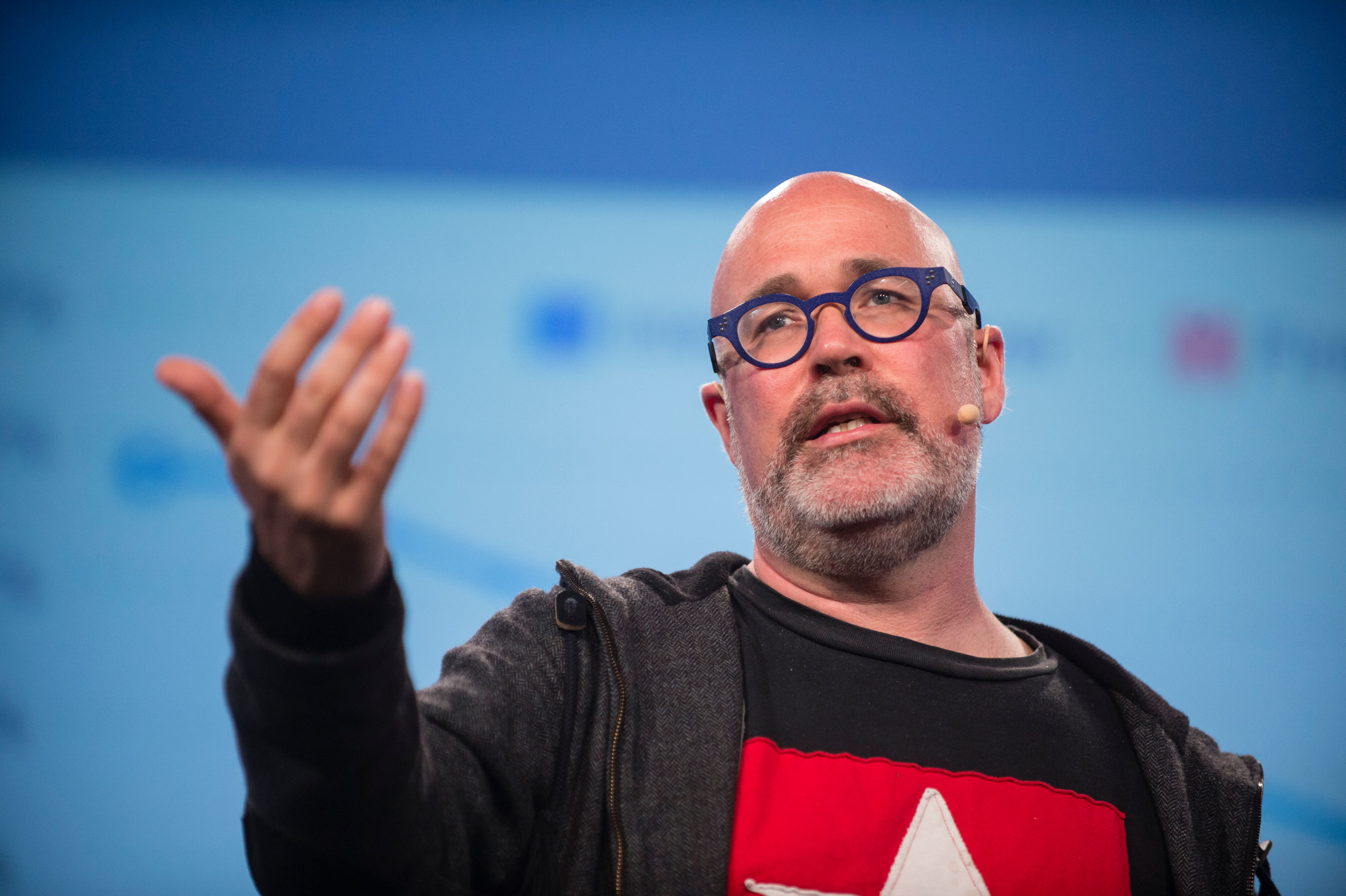
- Mark Surman at re:publica 10, 2016
- Born: February 20, 1969 (age 57); Toronto, Ontario, Canada
- Education: University of Toronto
- Occupation: President of the Mozilla Foundation
- Spouse: Tonya Surman (divorced)
- Children: Tristan Surman (1999) Ethan Surman (2002)
- Surman's voice recorded August 2017
- Website: marksurman.commons.ca

Mark Surman is a Canadian open internet activist and the president of the Mozilla Foundation. He is a leading advocate for trustworthy AI, digital privacy, and the open internet. Before joining the Mozilla Foundation, Mark spent more than 15 years leading organizations and projects promoting the use of the internet and open source for social empowerment in many countries around the world.

Surman is also an active board member, currently serving as an advisory board member of the McMaster University Masters in Public Policy, Digital Society program, the co-chair of the steering committee for the European AI Fund, and a board member for the Mozilla Foundation.

Surman's writing has appeared in The Washington Post, CNN.com, The Globe and Mail, Chronicle of Philanthropy, MIT's Innovations, and Fast Company. In 2005, Mark published the book Commonspace: Beyond Virtual Community. with Prentice Hall.

== Education and early employment ==
Surman received his bachelor's degree in the History of Community Media from the University of Toronto in 1996. His undergraduate thesis was entitled Wired Words: Utopia, Revolution, and the History of Electronic Highways. The paper was presented at the Internet Society's INET'96 conference.

In 1998, Surman co-founded and became president of the Commons Group, providing advice on networks, technology, and social change. During this time, Mark also led the development of the APC Action Apps, an open source project aimed at providing content publishing and sharing for activist organizations.

From 2005 to 2008, Surman was the managing director of telecentre.org. Created by Canada's International Development Research Centre, Swiss Agency for Development and Cooperation, and Microsoft, telecentre.org worked to network the global telecentre community and improve their sustainability. Mark co-edited the book From the Ground Up: the Evolution of the Telecentre Movement.

Surman was awarded one of the inaugural Shuttleworth Foundation fellowships in 2007. Shuttleworth Foundation provides funding for people using open source methods to create social change. There he helped advance thinking about how to apply open source approaches to philanthropy and contributed to the development of the Cape Town Declaration for Open Education.

== Mozilla Foundation ==
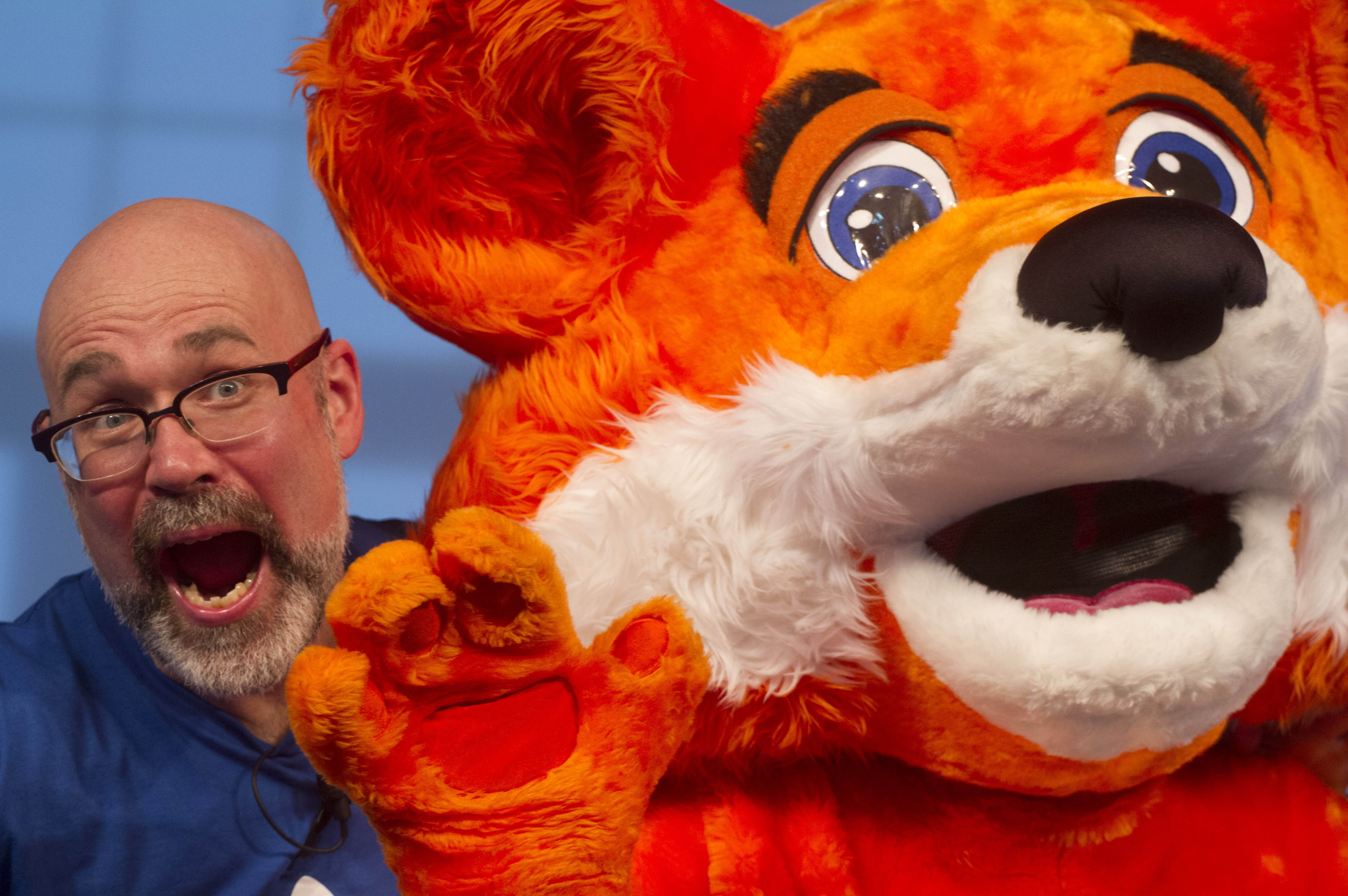
Mark Surman at Campus Party (2013)

In August 2008, Surman became the executive director of the Mozilla Foundation, the non-profit organization that supports the open source Mozilla project. The Foundation also runs advocacy programs and offers fellowships to protect the open internet. It is the sole owner of the Mozilla Corporation, which makes the Firefox web browser.

During his early years at the Foundation, Surman oversaw the development of the Mozilla Festival (2010), an annual gathering of people working on open internet and open source projects. He also led the development of the initial Mozilla Fellowship program with the Knight Foundation (2011), with a focus on putting open source developers in newsrooms. These efforts expanded Mozilla's work beyond its traditional focus on browser and email software.

Starting in 2012, Surman helped develop a collection of efforts focused on promoting digital literacy, including Mozilla's Maker Party event series and the Webmaker software project. These efforts also included a number of joint initiatives with MacArthur Foundation that focused on digital learning, including Open Badges and Hive. Mozilla's work on digital literacy was wound down in late 2017.

In 2016, Surman and others shifted the Foundation's focus toward supporting the growth of what they have called 'the internet health movement'. Work in this area has included the launch of the yearly Mozilla Internet Health Report, the Privacy Not Included guide, and campaigns advocating that companies like Amazon, Facebook and YouTube improve their products in the public interest. Programs such as MozFest and the Mozilla Fellowships have continued as a part of the Foundation's movement building activities.

In 2018, the Foundation further focused its movement building efforts around the theme of promoting responsible data and AI practices. The rationale for this focus was detailed in a paper entitled Creating Trustworthy AI, jointly written by Surman and Rebecca Ricks.

In 2022, Surman took on the additional role of Mozilla Foundation president, working with Mitchell Baker on Mozilla-wide strategy and expansion efforts. This included the launch of Mozilla Ventures, a fund to invest in responsible tech startups and Mozilla.ai, an R+D arm focused on translating computer science research into open source trustworthy AI products. In 2024, he was succeeded as executive director by Nabiha Syed. He remains the President of Mozilla.

In January 2026, Mark Surman directed and launched the State of Mozilla report. Surman has played a central role in framing Mozilla's position that the internet is undergoing a foundational transition, in which control over AI systems and infrastructure is becoming as consequential as control over the web itself. In public remarks and organizational strategy, he has emphasized the need to preserve openness, user agency, and decentralization at a time when technological development is becoming more concentrated within a small number of major firms.

In a recent article by CNBC he describes how he is building "a rebel alliance of sorts", of tech startups, developers and public interest technologists committed to making AI more open and trustworthy.

== Personal life ==
Surman was born and resides in Toronto, Ontario. He has two sons, Ethan and Tristan Surman. Both are members of the band The Neighbourhood Watch. He was married to long time collaborator and Centre for Social Innovation founder Tonya Surman.
