= To the Wild Country =

- Genre: Nature
- Presented by: Lorne Greene
- Country of origin: Canada
- Original language: English
- No. of seasons: 3
- No. of episodes: 10

Production
- Executive producer: Ralph C. Ellis
- Producers: John Foster; Janet Foster; Dan Gibson; Gerald S. Kedey
- Running time: 60 minutes
- Production company: KEG Productions

Original release
- Network: CBC Television
- Release: 19 November 1972 – 2 February 1975

To the Wild Country is a Canadian nature television program which aired on CBC Television from 1972 to 1975.

== Premise ==
Lorne Greene narrated and hosted this series of occasional specials which featured nature photographers John and Janet Foster in their exploration of the Canadian wilderness. Canada Trust was the primary series sponsor.

== Reception ==
The program attracted average ratings of 2.5 million viewers, reaching 3.5 million on one occasion.

The series required substantial financial support due to the remote location filming. Canada Trust cancelled its sponsorship after the 1974–75 season.

== Scheduling ==
This hour-long program was broadcast intermittently as follows (times in Eastern):

| Day | Time | Title | Notes |
|---|---|---|---|
| 19 November 1972 | 9:00 p.m. | "Kluane" | Set in the Yukon, at the National Park. |
| 10 December 1972 | 8:00 p.m. | "Return of the Giants" | Features footage of the Canada Goose, recorded near Guelph, Ontario at Kortright Waterfowl Park |
| 28 January 1973 | 7:00 p.m. | "The Other Newfoundland" | |
| 11 March 1973 | 8:00 p.m. | "A Wild Lens in Algonquin" | Filmed at Algonquin Provincial Park in Ontario. |
| 11 April 1973 | 8:00 p.m. | "Winter is a Way of Life" | Winter scenes filmed in northern Ontario and near Jasper, Alberta. |
| 18 November 1973 | 9:00 p.m. | "The Wild Pacific Shore" | Filmed at Pacific Rim National Park Reserve. |
| 9 December 1973 | 8:00 p.m. | "Winter is a Way of Life" | repeat |
| 27 January 1974 | 7:30 p.m. | "Land Of The Big Ice" | Set in Baffin Island National Park. |
| 24 February 1974 | 7:00 p.m. | "The Great Canadian Southwest" | Set in the Cypress Hills region of Alberta and Saskatchewan. |
| 31 March 1974 | 7:00 p.m. | "The Other Newfoundland" | repeat |
| 8 December 1974 | 7:00 p.m. | "The Great Gulf – The St. Lawrence" | Filmed in the region east of Quebec City along the north shore the St. Lawrence River, to its gulf |
| 6 January 1975 | 9:00 p.m. | "The Wild Pacific Shore" | repeat |
| 2 February 1975 | 7:00 p.m. | "The Wild Corners Of The Great Lakes" | Exploration of the land around Lake Superior. |
| 24 February 1975 | 9:00 p.m. | repeat, "Land Of The Big Ice" | |
