= Cap Tourmente National Wildlife Area =

National Wildlife Area in Quebec, Canada

- Réserve nationale de faune du cap Tourmente
- IUCN category IV (habitat/species management area)
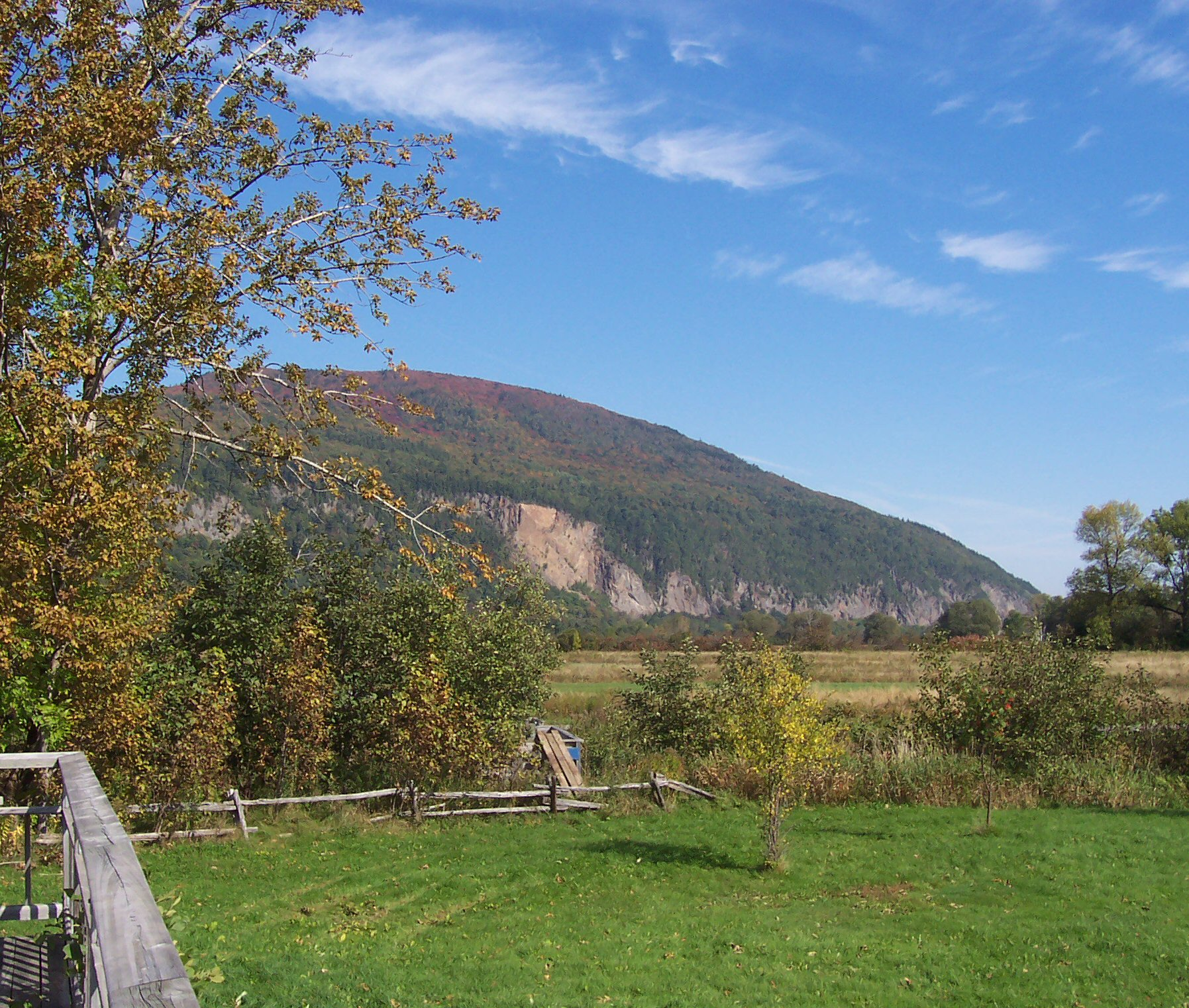
- Scenery at the Cap Tourmente National Wildlife Area
- Interactive map of Cap Tourmente National Wildlife Area
- Location: Saint-Joachim, La Côte-de-Beaupré Regional County Municipality, Quebec, Canada
- Coordinates: 47°5′N 70°47′W
- Area: 23.99 km^{2} (9.26 sq mi)
- Established: April 28, 1978
- Governing body: Canadian Wildlife Service

Ramsar Wetland
- Official name: Cap Tourmente
- Designated: 15 January 1981
- Reference no.: 214

The Cap Tourmente National Wildlife Area is a National Wildlife Area (NWA) located on the north shore of the Saint Lawrence River in the National Provincial Capital Region of Quebec, Canada, established on 28 April 1978. It is one of the critical habitats for the greater snow goose during migration. Flocks of tens of thousands of these birds stop over to feed on the bullrushes in the spring and fall. The tidal marsh was recognized as a wetland of international significance per the Ramsar Convention in 1981, the first North American site to receive that distinction.

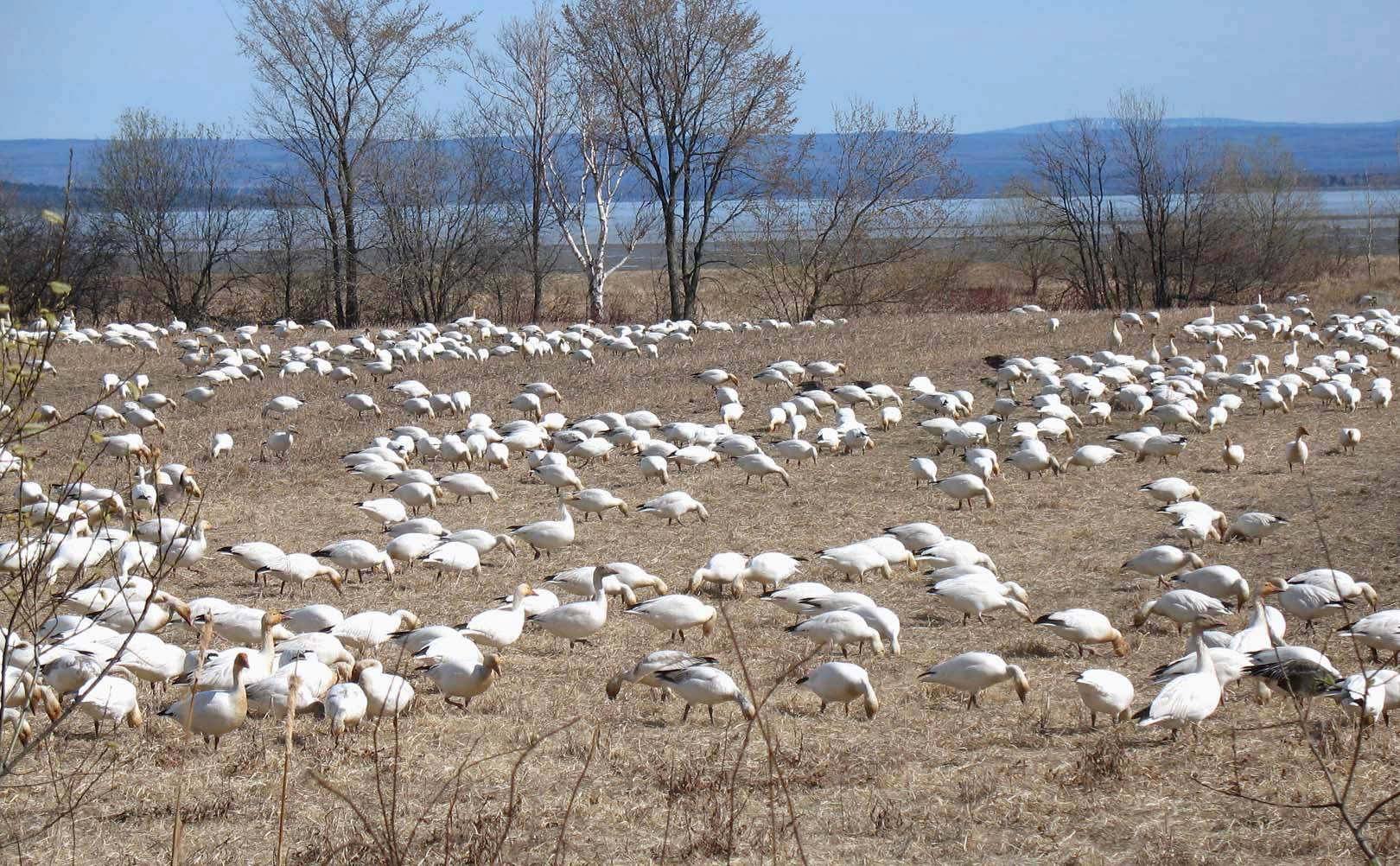
Snow goose

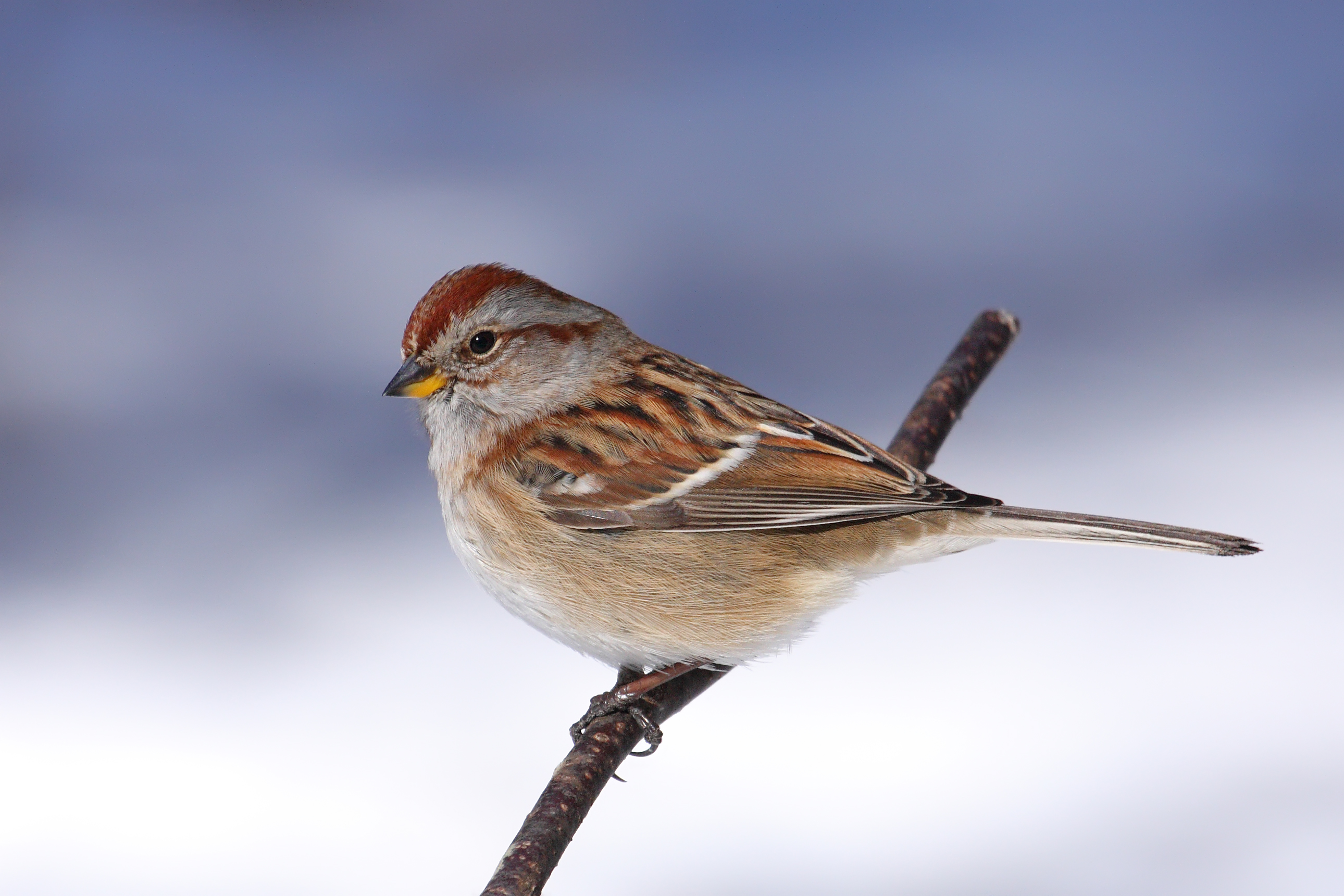
American tree sparrow (Spizelloides arborea)

== Location ==
Cap Tourmente is 50 km from Quebec City, and sits on the St. Lawrence River. The park is part of Saint-Joachim municipality. The location of the park sits at an intersection of Appalachian Mountains, Canadian Shield, the St. Lawrence Lowlands. Because of this, the park has a wide range of mountain views, marshlands, and plains, leading to diverse habitats and a diversity of plant and animal species. The marshlands of the park serve as many birds' migratory stopovers and breeding areas, which contributes to its importance as a protected area. The area is located at 47°03.860' N 70°47.774' W.

== History ==
A number of prehistoric Amerindian artifacts are found on the coastal plain, providing evidence of the presence of Indigenous peoples for over 2,000 years, starting at least 2,400 years ago. The evidence suggests the area was occupied by small bands of St. Lawrence Iroquoians, who were the dominant group in the St. Lawrence Valley for several centuries before the arrival of Europeans. They subsisted on agriculture, hunting and fishing in the St. Lawrence Valley region. In the late 16th century, the St. Lawrence Iroquoians mysteriously disappeared, abandoning their former territories sometime between the last voyage of the French explorer Jacques Cartier in 1541—Cap Tourmente was the first land fall for Jacques Cartier in 1535—and the subsequent expedition of Samuel de Champlain in 1603.

Within the wildlife refuge is a historic farm site, La Petite-Ferme du cap Tourmente, which was begun by Samuel de Champlain in 1626, as a food source for the fledgling Habitation at Quebec City. Later, the farm was purchased and run for nearly 300 years by and for the Seminary of Quebec. A farm house built around 1667 still stands, and is at the core of La Petite-Ferme du cap Tourmente National Historic Site, designated in 2018.

The Canadian government acquired the area in 1969. It was later recognised as a National Wildlife Area in 1978 and as a wetland of significance per the Ramsar Convention in 1981.

== Climate ==
Climate data for Cap Tourmente National Wildlife Area (1991−2020 normals, extremes 1993–2020)
Month	Jan	Feb	Mar	Apr	May	Jun	Jul	Aug	Sep	Oct	Nov	Dec	Year
Record high °C (°F)	12.7 (54.9)	12.9 (55.2)	20.2 (68.4)	27.6 (81.7)	32.6 (90.7)	34.0 (93.2)	35.1 (95.2)	33.5 (92.3)	32.7 (90.9)	25.4 (77.7)	20.5 (68.9)	17.2 (63.0)	35.1 (95.2)
Mean daily maximum °C (°F)	−5.4 (22.3)	−3.7 (25.3)	1.3 (34.3)	8.8 (47.8)	16.9 (62.4)	22.1 (71.8)	25.0 (77.0)	24.2 (75.6)	19.5 (67.1)	12.2 (54.0)	4.9 (40.8)	−2.0 (28.4)	10.3 (50.5)
Daily mean °C (°F)	−10.1 (13.8)	−8.8 (16.2)	−3.4 (25.9)	4.0 (39.2)	11.3 (52.3)	16.5 (61.7)	19.5 (67.1)	18.8 (65.8)	14.4 (57.9)	7.7 (45.9)	1.2 (34.2)	−6.1 (21.0)	5.4 (41.7)
Mean daily minimum °C (°F)	−14.8 (5.4)	−13.9 (7.0)	−8.1 (17.4)	−0.9 (30.4)	5.7 (42.3)	10.9 (51.6)	14.0 (57.2)	13.3 (55.9)	9.2 (48.6)	3.1 (37.6)	−2.6 (27.3)	−10.2 (13.6)	0.5 (32.9)
Record low °C (°F)	−33.5 (−28.3)	−32.5 (−26.5)	−29.0 (−20.2)	−17.4 (0.7)	−3.4 (25.9)	1.9 (35.4)	6.1 (43.0)	4.8 (40.6)	−1.1 (30.0)	−8.7 (16.3)	−18.6 (−1.5)	−31.7 (−25.1)	−33.5 (−28.3)
Average relative humidity (%) (at 15:00 LST)	66.8	62.6	61.0	56.6	57.4	62.5	64.8	63.4	64.4	65.2	68.0	71.8	63.7
Source: Environment and Climate Change Canada

== Wildlife ==
The Cap Tourmente National Wildlife Area has a wide range of habitats and comprises 400 hectares of tidal marsh, 100 hectares of coastal meadow, 700 hectares of agricultural land and 1198 hectares of forest. It is the home to a wide range of animals and plants, including more than 200 animal species and 700 plant species. The intertidal bulrush, coastal bulrush and coastal plain and mixed-forest plateau provides crucial habitat for the staging of migratory birds and serves as birds' breeding grounds. The keystone species of the NWA include greater snow goose, peregrine falcon, and warblers in spring.

=== Plants ===
==== Intertidal marsh ====
The Cap Tourmente NWA was created mainly to protect the vast amount of intertidal marshes that are present in the NWA, especially the American bulrushes, which attracts tens of thousands of greater snow geese during the spring and fall migration period. These marshes occupy 2,500 hectares and include close to 60% of all the bulrush marshes in Québec. Heavy tidal flooding by fresh waters on the coastal flats covers a large amount of intertidal marsh. The intertidal marshes in the NWA can be divided into three separate zones, including the upper, middle, and the lower zone. All three zones are predominantly dominated by American bulrushes. Southern wild rice (Zizania aquatica) and broad-leaved arrowhead (Sagittaria latifolia) are also present in the upper and the middle zone. According to a study conducted in the NWA, the American bulrush has decreased significantly in the intertidal marsh during the year 1977 and 2002, and is being replaced by southern wild rice. But the American bulrushes remain the dominant species in all three zones. The plants in the intertidal marsh are crucial in protecting the coastal area from coastal erosion, and can serve as food for the snow geese. Other animals also feed on these bulrushes, such as American black duck, mallard, northern pintail, blue-winged teal, green-winged teal, American wigeon, northern shoveler, and wood duck.

==== Forested areas ====
The forested areas in the NWA covered around 40% of the total area. There are 21 types of forest stands found in the NWA, and sugar maple stands dominate the area.

Listed Plant Species under the Species at Risk Act (SARA) include Victorin's water-hemlock and butternut. Habitat loss remains as the largest threat to the plants species in the region.

=== Animals ===
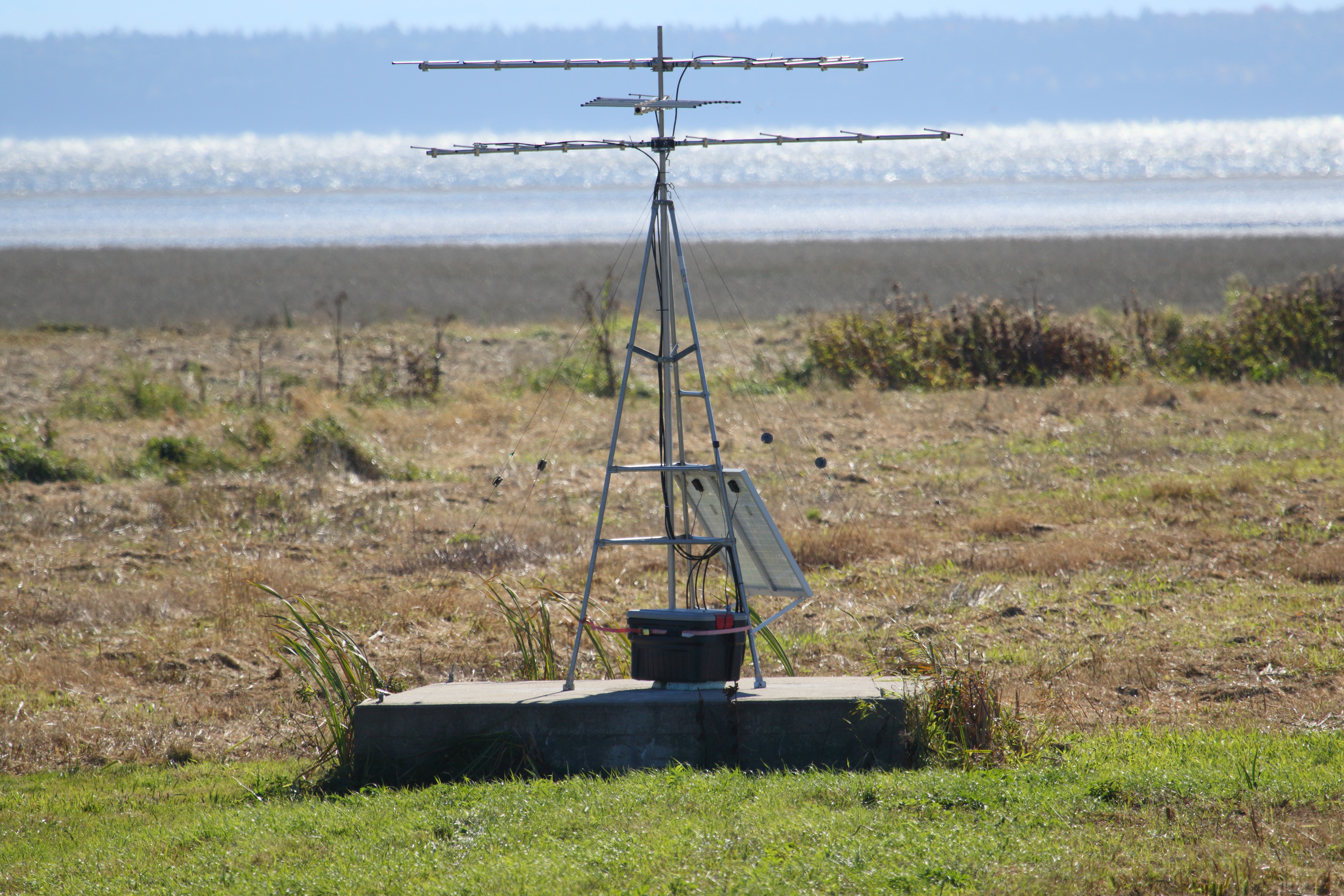
A receiving antenna for Motus wildlife tracking network.

==== Birds ====
The Cap Tourmente National Wildlife Area is one of the 325 Important Birds Area (IBA) in Canada, categorised under the A4 criteria.

At the beginning of the 20th century, the population of greater snow geese was dangerously low at only around 3,000 individuals. However, after conservation efforts like the establishment of the NWA, their population started to grow exponentially in the mid-1980s, and is now close to one million. During their biennial journey between the Atlantic coast and the Far North, greater snow geese stop in Cap Tourmente NWA where they feed on American bulrush rhizomes and also grain in the fields. At 2021, up to 56,500 greater snow geese were counted at Cap Tourmente NWA.

In the spring, they gather at the Lac-Saint-Pierre and other sites, moving west to east along the St. Lawrence River, before they head north. In the fall, the birds disperse from the Quebec City area in late October and move a short distance southwest towards Lac-Saint-Pierre or northern Lake Champlain, where they feed in corn fields and where some remain well into November and December. Cap Tourmente's location lies right next to their path of migration, which makes the NWA such an important part in the survival of this species.

At Cap Tourmente, bird species listed under the Species at Risk Act (SARA) include peregrine falcon (anatum/tundrius), bobolink, wood thrush, short-eared owl, bank swallow, barn swallow, chimney swift, olive-sided flycatcher, Canada warbler, least bittern, loggerhead shrike (migrans subspecies), rusty blackbird, yellow rail, and eastern meadowlark.

==== Fish ====
The strong tides bring slightly salty water from the river to the coastal region. The herbaceous environment with shallow water makes an ideal environment for fish species to spawn there, such as yellow perch, the northern pike, and the three-spined stickleback.

Habitat loss and obstacles to migration area the main threats to the fish species in the region. Other potential threats includes oil spill from the upper part of the river and other source of water pollution from human activities.

== Management ==
Environment and Climate Change Canada (Canadian Wildlife Service) is the management agency of the NWA.

=== Hunting ===
When the territory was acquired by the federal government in 1969, all hunting activities were suspended. Since 1972, the Canadian Wildlife Service began its controlled hunting program in order to regulate the great snow goose population. The hunting programme was introduced to control the goose population and prevent overuse of the bulrush marsh and fields in the NWA or adjacent fields. In the fall, a controlled greater snow goose hunt is authorised in eight hunting grounds grouped into four zones with a total area of approximately 53 hectares. Participants are selected through a draw to decide the maximum of 512 permits. During the annual Waterfowler hunting day, permits are issued to maximum 12 young hunters to practice their waterfowl hunting skills and learn about wildlife conservation during the regular hunting season.

In 2009 and 2010, an experimental licence was issued to the Association des Amis du Cap Tourmente, but the licence was not renewed afterwards.

The 2022 Hunt Program for the greater snow goose is cancelled due to COVID-19 concerns.

=== Invasive species ===
Nine plants are considered invasive. Cow parsley, hedge bedstraw, and reed mannagrass are ubiquitous, and the common reed and Japanese knotweed are among the most threatening invasive species in the NWA.

== Park attractions ==
This park can be considered a nature attraction, where visitors are permitted to enter during set times with a small entry fee (up to $6 for adults) until a closing time at 5pm on most days of the week. The park can see up to 40,000 visitors per year, with the attractions being hiking trails, nature observation, bird watching, picnic areas, and planned school trips. The official websites recommend spending from 2-4 hours per visit to the park. With its location, the park itself is home to many migratory birds with the main attraction being the greater snow geese flocks.
