= Kitney =

Kitney may refer to:

- Kitney Island, island of Antarctica
- Ron Kitney (1918–2011), Australian politician

== See also ==
- Kidney, organ
- Kutney, surname
