= 121st Fighter Escadrille (Poland) =

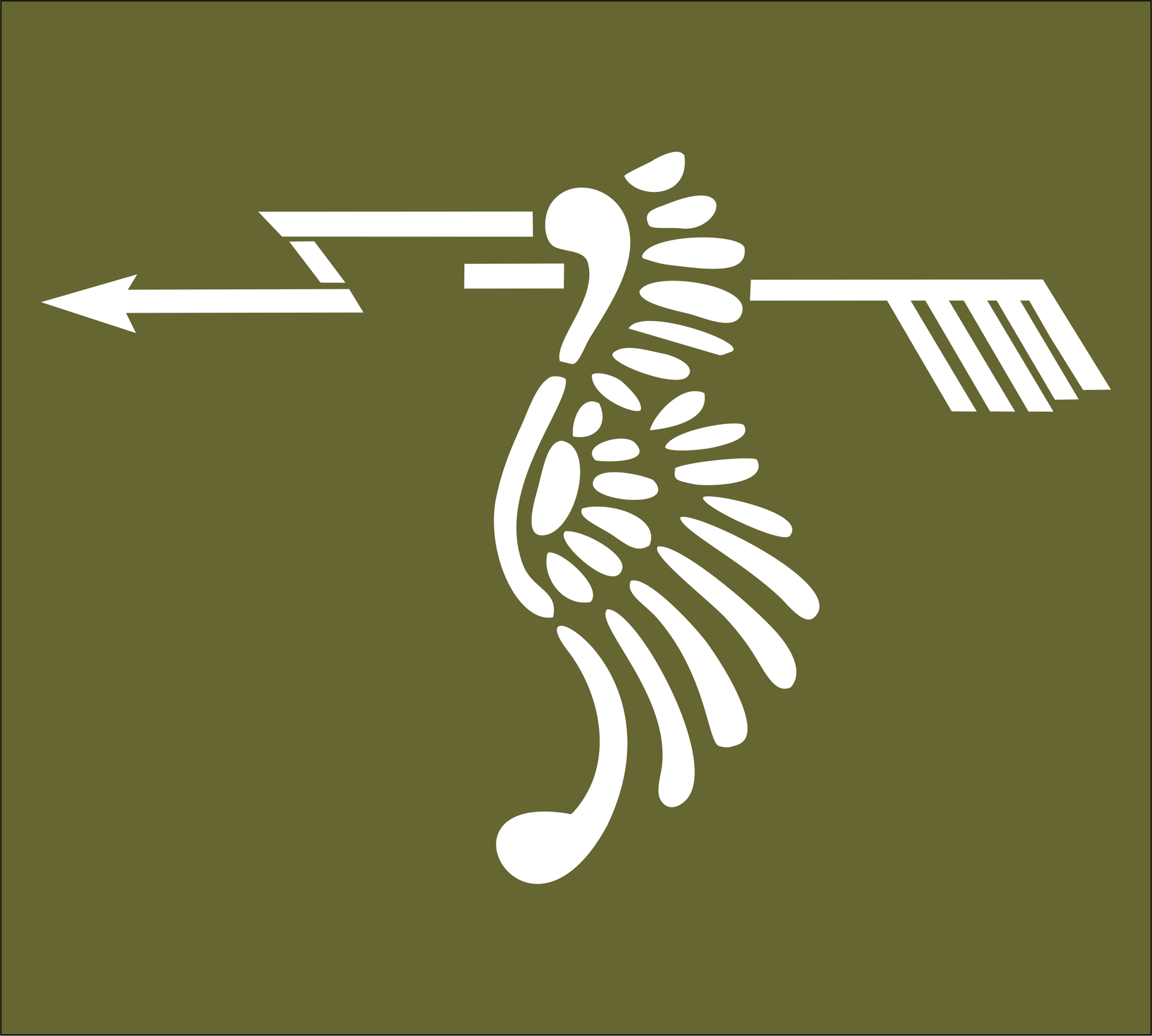
- 121st Squadron Insignia
- Active: 1925-1939
- Disbanded: September 1939
- Country: (Poland) Second Polish Republic
- Branch: Polish Air Force
- Size: 11 Pilots
- Part of: 2nd Air Regiment
- Aircraft: PZL P.11
- Engagements: World War II: Invasion of Poland

Commanders
- Notable commanders: Tadeusz Sędzielowski

The 121st Fighter Escadrille of the Polish Air Force (Polish: 121. Eskadra Myśliwska) was one of the fighter units of the Polish Army in 1939.

== History ==
In the spring of 1925, the 113th Fighter Squadron was formed as a part of the 11th Fighter Regiment in the Mokotów Airport. It was equipped with 13 Ansaldo A.1 Balilla fighter planes. The squadron soon received Blériot SPAD 61C1 fighter planes. At the end of 1925 the squadron was transferred to Lida Airport. In 1926, Lieutenant Pil, Bolesław Orliński and aircraft mechanic Leonard Kubiak of the squadron flew from Warsaw to Tokyo and back to Warsaw in 121 hours, covering 22,600 kilometres (14,000 mi) in a Bréguet 19 B.2. In 1928, the 11th Air Regiment was disbanded and 113th Fighter Squadron was transferred to the 2nd Air Regiment and was redesignated as the 121st Fighter Escadrille.

On July 14, 1928, the Escadrille was transferred from Lida to Kraków. The Escadrille often took part in air shows, where it often competed against the 122nd Fighter Escadrille. In 1930, the escadrille began to receive Avia BH-33 fighter planes, along with Wibault 70 C1 fighter planes as training aircraft. In August and September 1932, the Escadrille participated in air parades celebrating Poland's victory in the Challenge International de Tourisme 1932. In 1933, the escadrille was equipped with PZL P.7a fighter planes. It participated in another air parade, celebrating Poland's victory in the Challenge International de Tourisme 1934. In 1936, the escadrille received the new PZL P.11a fighter plane. In 1938, the escadrille received the PZL P.11c.

In September 1939, the 121st Fighter Escadrille was attached to the Army Kraków.

== Crew and equipment ==
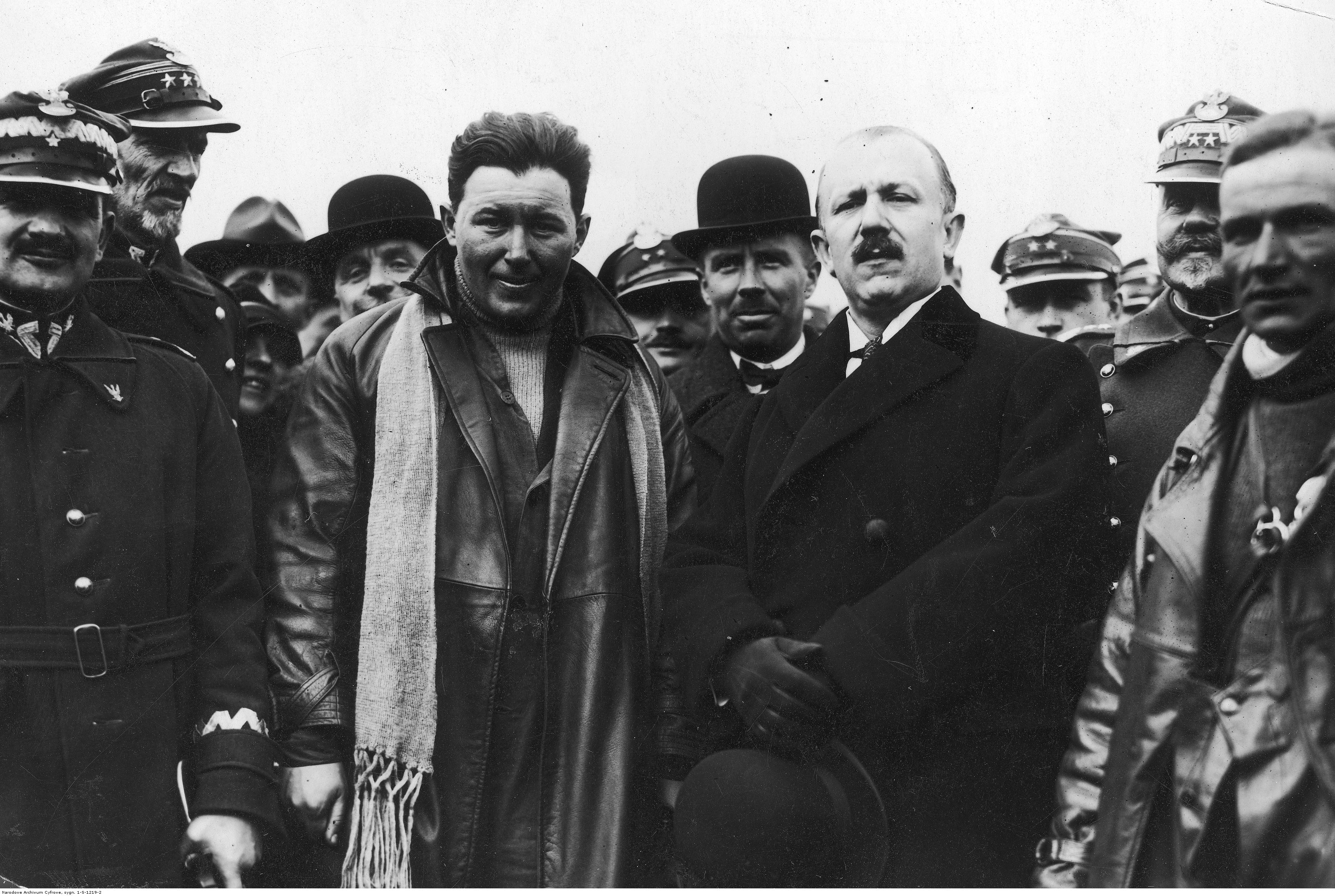
Bolesław Orliński after the Warsaw-Tokyo-Warsaw flight

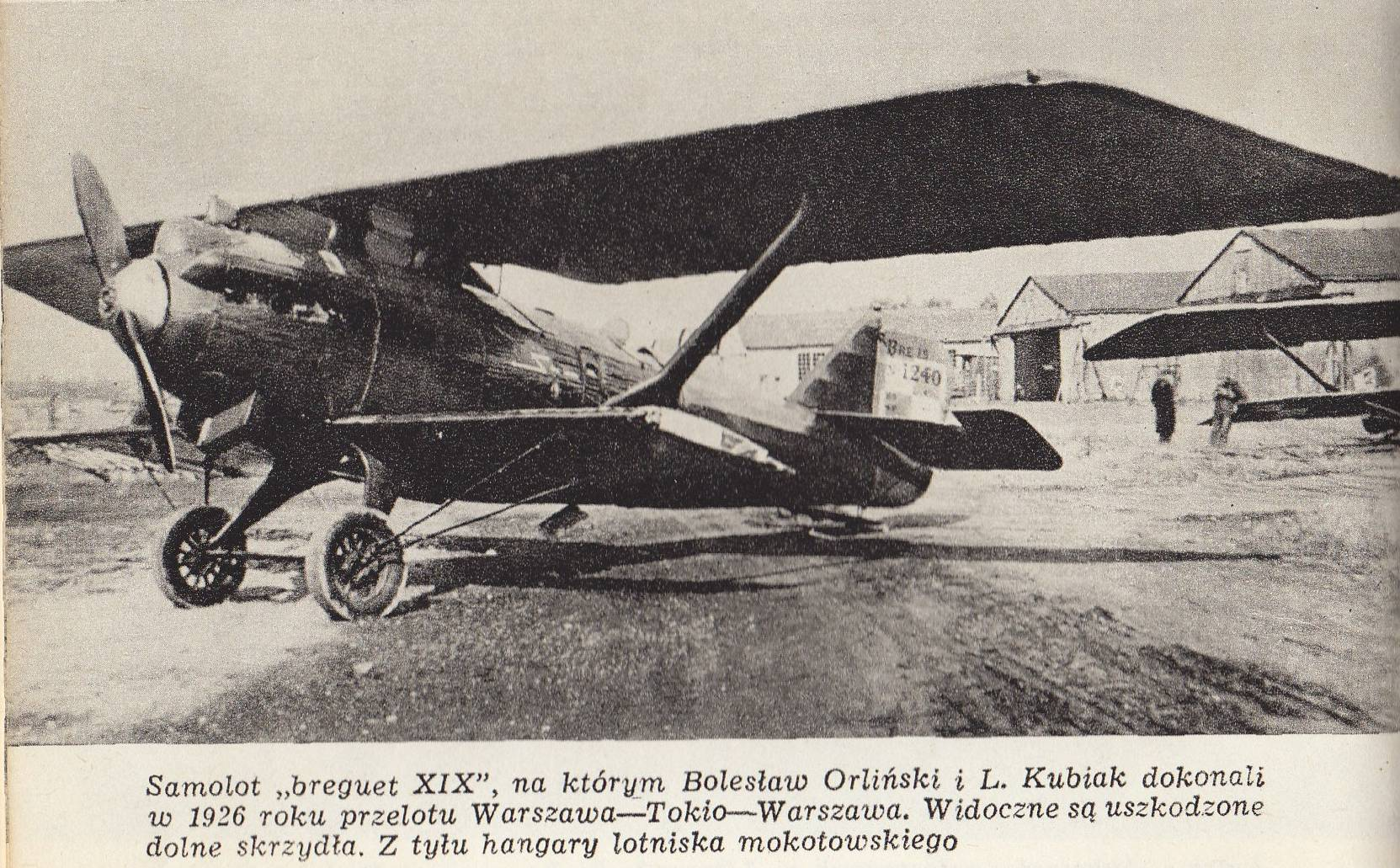
The breguet 19 B.2 flown by Bolesław Orliński

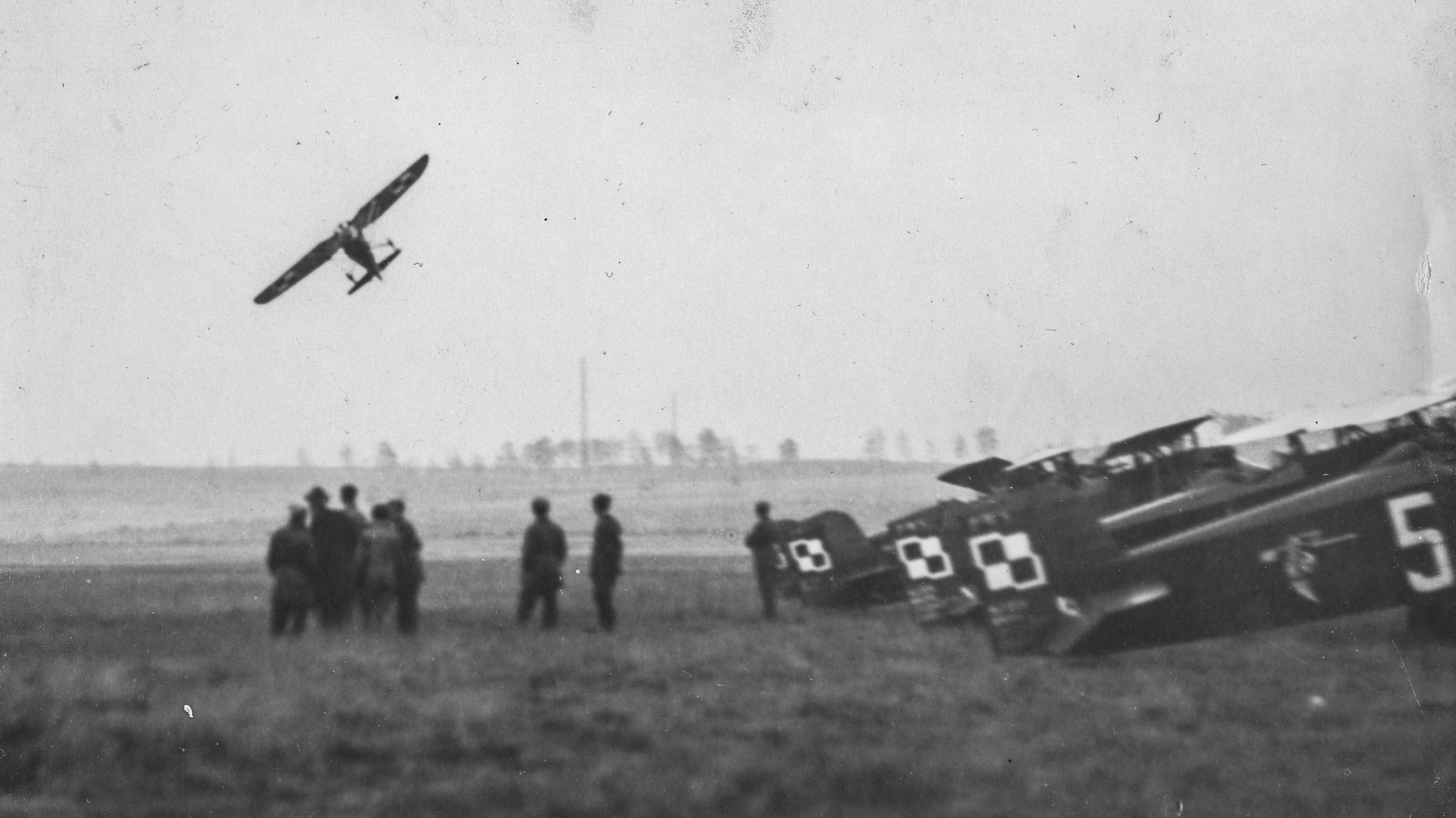
The 121st Fighter Escadrille at an airshow in Katowice, October 1931

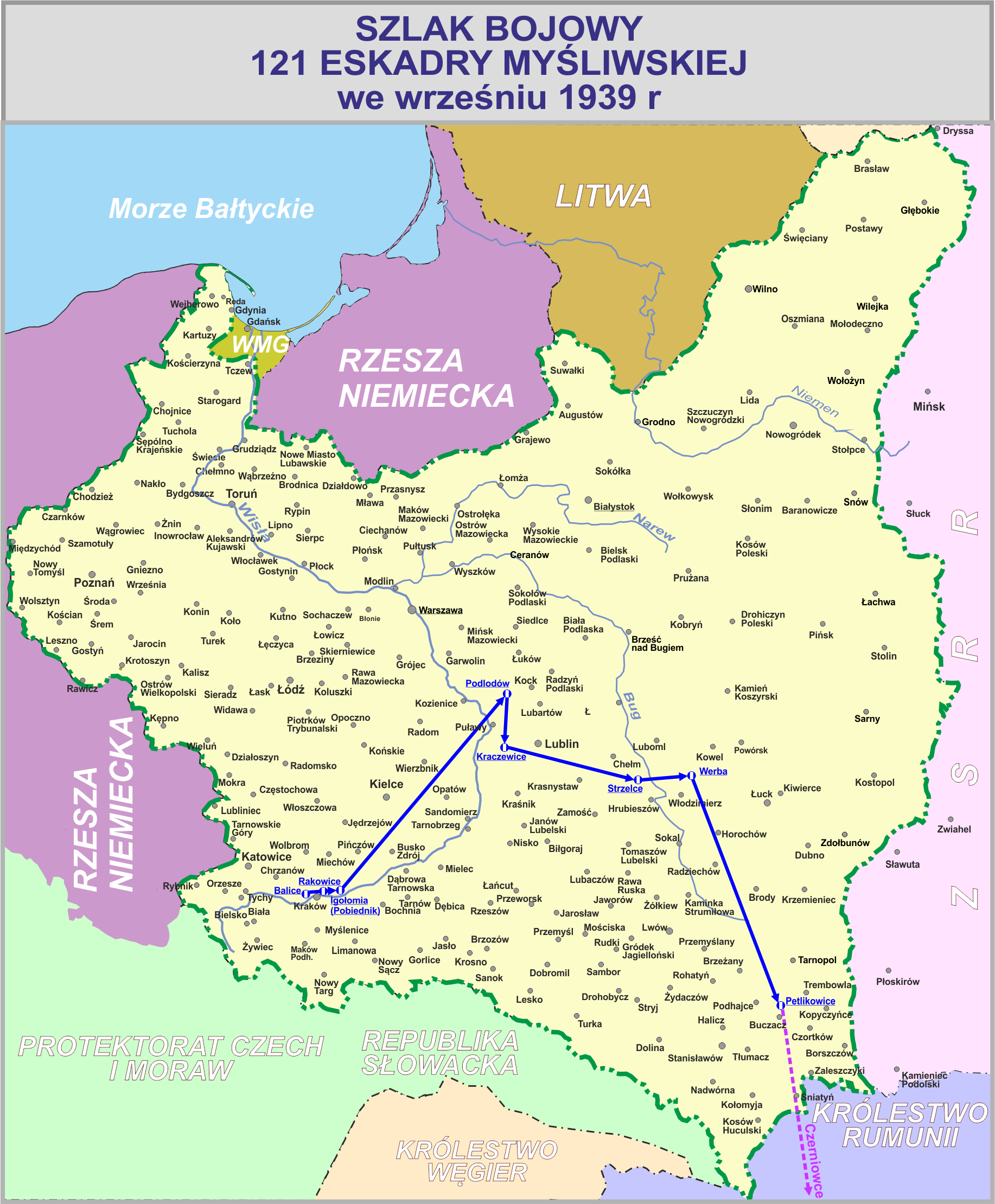

On 1 September 1939, the escadrille had 10 PZL P.11c airplanes.

The air crew consisted of: commanding officer kpt. pil. Tadeusz Sędzielowski

his deputy ppor. pil. Wacław Król

and 11 other pilots:

1. ppor. Tadeusz Kowalewski
2. ppor. Tadeusz Nowak
3. ppor. Władysław Gnyś
4. pchor.Władysław Chciuk
5. pchor. Ryszard Koczor
6. pchor. Franciszek Surma
7. plut. Leopold Flanek
8. kpr. Jan Kremski
9. kpr. Piotr Zaniewski
10. st.szer. Tadeusz Arabski
11. st.szer. Marian Futro

== See also ==
- Polish Air Force order of battle in 1939
