= Dan Gibson =

Canadian photographer, cinematographer and sound recordist

- Born: Daniel Armstrong Gibson; January 19, 1922; Montreal, Canada
- Died: March 18, 2006 (aged 84); Toronto, Canada
- Education: Upper Canada College
- Occupation: Photographer · cinematographer · sound recordist
- Years active: 1978–2006
- Notable work: Solitudes
- Style: Nature recordings · new-age · ambient · field recording · world · Celtic · birdsong
- Spouse(s): Helen Frances MacLure, 1948
- Children: Gordon, Dan Jr., Holly & Mary Jane
- Awards: The Order of Canada, Walt Grealis Special Achievement Award at the Juno Awards, etc.

Dan Gibson (January 19, 1922 – March 18, 2006) was a Canadian photographer, cinematographer and sound recordist.

== Career ==
During the late 1940s, Dan Gibson took photographs and made nature films, including Audubon Wildlife Theatre. Gibson produced many films and television series through which he learned how to record wildlife sound. He pioneered techniques of recording, and also helped design equipment to optimize results, including the "Dan Gibson Parabolic Microphone". Some of his early recordings of the 1950s and 1960s were released on LP records, and started his Solitudes series, which was introduced in 1981.

Gibson is well regarded for his contributions to the Friends of Algonquin Park, and his dedication to the Algonquin Park Residents Association. Having a lease of land in Algonquin Provincial Park gave Gibson and his family (wife: Helen, children: Mary-Jane or "Kirkie," Holly, Dan, and Gordon) an opportunity to connect with nature, and it certainly fueled his passion for the study, preservation and interaction with wildlife.

In 1994, Gibson was awarded The Order of Canada for his environmental works. In 1997, he was awarded the Walt Grealis Special Achievement Award at the Juno Awards ceremony in Hamilton, Ontario.

In 2004, he released his first DVD, Natural Beauty, which was originally shot in High Definition.

== Major productions ==
- Wings in the Wilderness – Feature Film (Narrated by Lorne Greene)
- Audubon Wildlife Theatre – 78 episode TV series
- Wildlife Cinema – multiple episode TV series
- To the Wild Country – 10 episode TV series (Narrated by Lorne Greene)
- Wild Canada – multiple episode TV series

== Awards ==
=== Film awards ===
Award/organization	Year	Nominee/work	Category	Ref.
San Francisco Film Festival	1965	"Whitethroat"	Golden Gate Award	
Canadian Film Awards	1967	"Land of the Loon"	Best Film of the Year	
Canadian Film Awards	1967	"Adventure: Trent Severn Style"	Award of Merit	
Michigan Outdoors Writers	1969	"Winter Potpourri"	Award of Merit	
Canadian Film Awards	1971	"Solitudes: Sounds of Nature"	Best sound in Non-Theatrical Film	
American Film Festival	1972	"Fly Geese F-L-Y"	Blue ribbon for Best Children's Film	
U.S. National Outdoor-Travel Film Festival	1973	"Golden Autumn"	Teddy Award	
Canadian Film Awards	1972	"Dan Gibson's Nature Family"	Best Wildlife Film of the Year	
Canadian Film Awards	1973	"To the Wild Country: Return of the Giants"	Best Wildlife Film of the Year	
Canadian Film Awards	1974	"To the Wild Country: Land of the Big Ice"	Best Wildlife Film of the Year	
Etrog (Genie) Award	1975	"Wings in the Wilderness"	Best Sound in a Theatrical Film	
U.S. National Educational Film Festival	1977	"Return of the Winged Giants"	John Muir Award for Best Ecological Film	
Saskatchewan International Film Festival	1977	"Return of the Winged Giants"	Best Wildlife Film	

=== Album awards ===
- Solitudes albums have sold over 20,000,000 worldwide
- 15 Solitudes albums have been Certified Gold (50,000 units sold) in Canada
- 11 Solitudes albums have been Certified Platinum (100,000 units sold) or multi-Platinum status.

== Discography ==
Until April 2012, about 234 albums (including 13 compilations) were released by Solitudes, including:

- Solitudes 25: Silver Anniversary Collection
- Best of Solitudes: 20th Anniversary
- Listen to the Mockingbird
- Loon Echo Lake
- Natural Beauty DVD
- Rolling Thunder
- Wildlife Identification by Sound
- Spring Romance
- H20

Title	Year	Tracks
Sounds Of Algonquin	1978	Loons And Wolves; Evening Paddle
Solitudes - Environmental Sound Experiences Volume 1	1981	By Canoe To Loon Lake; Dawn By A Gentle Stream
Solitudes - Environmental Sound Experiences Volume 2	1981	Heavy Surf On A Rocky Point Along A Sand Spit; Ocean Surf In A Hidden Cove
Solitudes - Environmental Sound Experiences Volume 3	1981	Among The Giant Trees Of The Wild Pacific Coast; Spring Morning On The Prairies
Solitudes - Environmental Sound Experiences Volume 4	1982	Niagara Falls, The Gorge And Glen; Among The Ponds And Streams Of Niagara
Solitudes - Environmental Sound Experiences Volume 5	1982	Dawn On The Desert; Among The Mountain Canyons And Valleys
Solitudes - Environmental Sound Experiences Volume 6	1982	Storm On A Wilderness Lake; Night On A Wilderness Lake
Solitudes - Environmental Sound Experiences Volume 7	1983	Night In A Southern Swamp; Don't Feed The Alligators
Solitudes - Sampler Album	1984	By Canoe To Loon Lake; Spring Morning On The Prairies; Ocean Surf In A Hidden Cove; Night In A Southern Swamp; Sailing To A Hidden Cove; Dawn On The Desert; Dawn By A Gentle Stream; Dont Feed The Alligators; Morning Fog (Seascapes); Coastal Storm (Seascapes); Yellowstone (Nat. Parks & Sanctuaries Edition); Storm On A Wilderness Lake; Hiking Over The Highlands; Among The Mountain Canyons And Valleys; Heavy Surf On A Rocky Point And Along A Sand Spit; Among The Giant Trees Of The Wild Pacific Coast; Among The Ponds And Streams Of Niagara; Night On A Wilderness Lake; Niagara Falls, The Gorge And Glen; Seashore (Tradewind Islands); Rain Forest (Tradewind Islands); Arctic (National Parks & Sanctuaries Edition)
Solitudes - Environmental Sound Experiences Volume 8	1984	Sailing To A Hidden Cove; Hiking Over The Highlands
Solitudes II - Opus One - Land Of The Loon	1984	Land Of The Loon; Land Of The Loon
Solitudes II - Opus Two	1984	Under Sail; Dangerous Cargo
Solitudes - Environmental Sound Experiences Volume 9 - Seascapes (The Changing Moods Of A Wild Coast)	1985	Seascapes; Seascapes
Solitudes - Environmental Sound Experiences Volume 10 - Tradewind Islands (A Caribbean Adventure In Sound)	1985	Tradewind Islands
Solitudes - Environmental Sound Experiences Volume 11 - National Parks And Sanctuaries Edition	1987	Atlantic Coast; Great Smoky Mountains National Park; Algonquin Provincial Park; Everglades National Park; Grand Canyon National Park; Yellowstone National Park; Yosemite National Park; Pacific Coast; Rain Forests; Arctic
Solitudes - Environmental Sound Experiences Volume 12 - Listen To The Loons	1988	Listen To The Loons; Listen To The Loons
Solitudes - Harmony: Exploring Nature With Music	1989	Stream Of Dreams; Spring Cloudburst; Freedom At Sea; At Night In The Everglades; Arctic Life; Coastal Fog; Solitudes On Loon Echo Lake; Desert Awakening; Pacific Rainforest; Timberwolves; Wilderness Lost
Solitudes - Pacific Suite	1990	Pacific Morning; Redwoods Forest; Humpback Whales; Elk In The Rainforest; River To Ocean; Return To The Sea
Solitudes - Breaking Through The Mist	1990	Dawn Of The Lake; Burning Mist; Awakening Voice; Hardwood Haven; Beneath A Towering Pine; North Wind Rising; Along The Darkening Shore; Return To The Pack; Night Life; Celestial Blanket
Solitudes - Great Lakes Suite	1991	From The Height Of Land; The Runoff; Superior The Inland Sea; Sandhill Cranes; Kirtland's Warbler; Sailing To The North Shore; The Pool At Baie Fine; Canada Geese; Erie Marshes; Over Niagara Falls; Along Ontario Shores
Solitudes - Exploring Nature With Music: The Classics	1991	Morning From The Peer Gynt Suite, Opus 46; Nocturne In E Flat, Opus 9, No.2; Prelude To The Afternoon Of A Faun; Claire De Lune; Moonlight Sonata Opus 27, No.2; Air In C; Rêverie; Piano Concerto In A Minor, Opus 16; Canon In D; Ocean Surf; Along Ontario Shores
Solitudes - Christmas Classics	1992	Pizzicato; Skater's Waltz; Dance Of The Reed Flutes; Waltz In C# Minor; Dance Of The Sugar Plum Fairy; Merry Gentlemen; Greensleeves; Jesu, Joy Of Man's Desiring; Ave Maria; O Holy Night; Along Ontario Shores
Solitudes - Atlantic Suite	1992	After The Storm; The Gannets; Offshore Breeze; New England Trail; Dunes On The Cape; Southern Islands; Gentle Shores; Hanging Mist; Mockingbird Farewell; To Lands Unknown
Solitudes - Exploring Nature With Music: The Classics II	1992	Vivaldi's Four Seasons: "Spring"; "Summer"; "Autumn"; "Winter"; Mendelssohn's "Spring Song"; Sinding's "Rustle Of Spring"; Chopin's "Etude In E Major"; Beethoven's "Fir Elise"; Schubert's "Serenade"; Offenbach's "Barcarolle"; Mendellsohn's "On Wings Of Song"; Listz's "Liebestraum"
Solitudes - Algonquin Suite	1992	First Light; At The Campsite; Paddle And Portage; Standing Tall; Easy Stream; Marshlands; Forest Song; Eyes Of The Night; Reunion Of Wolves; The Campfire
Solitudes - Rocky Mountain Suite	1993	The Runoff; Glacier Lake; The Foothills; Westbound; The Thermal Song; Summer's Eve On A Mountain Lake; The Bugling Elk; Winter's Wolves; Dreaming Of Spring
Solitudes - Appalachian Mountain Suite	1994	Arrival Of Spring; Marshlands; Forest Ridge; Around The Campfire; Mountain Stream; Lake Voices; The Maritimes
Solitudes -Southwest Suite	1994	Morning In Saguaro Valley; High Country Trail; Evening In Saguaro Canyon; Grand Canyon Base; Dry Desert Valley; Desert Rain; Along The River Bank; Valley Of The Trogons; Night In Creek Canyon
Solitudes - Christmas In The Country	1994	Huron Carol; O Come All Ye Faithful; Good King Wenceslas; We Three Kings; Angels We Have Heard On High; O Come, O Come, Emmaneul; Coventry Carol; Deck The Halls; Away In The Manger; A Midnight Clear; Silent Night; The First Noel; Huron Carol (Alto Flute Solo)
Solitudes - Angels Of The Sea	1995	Angels Of The Sea; Florida Dream; Skimming Waves; Island Lagoon; Free Spirit; Laguna Pastoria; The Light Of Baja; Northern Inlet
Solitudes - Thunderstorm In The Wilderness	1995	Thunderstorm In The Wilderness
Solitudes - Journey With The Whales	1995	Across The Circular Horizon; Arctic Passage; Mirrors Of Wind And Sea; Up Through The Water; Into The Sky; Aquatic Celebration
Solitudes - Ocean Surf (Timeless And Sublime)	1995	Ocean Surf
Solitudes - Legend Of The Wolf	1995	Silent Running; In The Den; Play Fight; Learning To Howl; Moving The Pack; First Hunt; The Beckoning; Rituals Of Winter
Solitudes - Pachelbel - Forever By The Sea	1995	The Canon Stirs; Beyond The Horizon; In A Protected Cove; Forever By The Sea; Ancient Harbor; Timeless And Free; The Beckoning Sea
Solitudes - Rhythms Of The Sea - Eight Piano Moods	1995	Morning Song; Alone But For A Friend; Rolling Stones; Coastal Marsh; Song Of The Sea; Wings Above The Sea; On The Crest Of A Wave; By The Lighthouse
Solitudes - Loon Echo Lake	1995	Vivaldi's Summer From The Four Seasons; Debussy's Claire De Lune; Awakening Voice; Summer's Eve On A Mountain Lake; Loon Echo Lake; Lake Voices; First Light; Eyes Of The Night; Pool At Baie Fine
Solitudes - Raindance - Impressions Of A Native Land	1995	Prelude; The Welcome; Whitewater; Hot Sun; Raindance; Spirit Of The Water; The Arrival; Ganohonyok; Spirit Of The Hunter; Eyo Tse No
Solitudes - Nature's Ballet	1995	Swan Lake - Theme by Tchaikovsky; Trois Gymnopedies - Gymnopedie #1 by Satie; Coppelia - Waltz from Act 1 Léo Delibes; Las Meninas - Pavane, op. 50 by Gabriel Fauré; Les Sylphides - Prelude, op. 28, no. 7 by Chopin; Carnival of the Animals - The Dying Swan by Saint-Saëns; Tale of the Young Prince - Scheherazade by Rimsky-Korsakov; Sleeping Beauty - Waltz by Tchaikovsky; Midsummernight's Dream - Notturno by Mendelssohn; Excerpt from Act II by Adolphe Adam
Solitudes - Forest Piano	1996	A Path To Solitude; Beauty Abounds; Moody Afternoon; Ancient Stand; Summer Sublime; Chasing The Clouds; Dreaming By The Stream; Hymn To The Old Growth
Solitudes - Christmas Wonder	1996	Let All Mortal Flesh Keep Silence; Joy To The World; Angels From The Realm Of Glory; Once In Royal David's City; Patapan 1; Hark The Herald Angels Sing; Sussex Mummer's Carol; The Holl And The Ivy; In The Bleak Midwinter; Patapan 2; O Little Town Of Bethlehem; While Shepherds Watched; Carol Of The Bells; I Wonder As I Wander; Patapan 3; O Come All Ye Faithful; Little Jesus, Sweetly Sleep; What Child Is This? (Greensleeves)
Solitudes - Spirit Of Africa	1996	Pride Of Lions; Flamingo Feast; Fresh Water Marsh; Exodus; Wooded Retreat; The Elephants Arrive; Hippo Wallow; Night On The Serengeti
Solitudes - Songbirds At Sunrise	1996	New England Spring; Northern Mist; Southern Symphony; Coastal Horizons; Prairie Glory; Dawn In The Valley; Desert Sunrise; Pacific Inlet
Solitudes - Australian Odyssey	1996	Kookaburra; Walkabout; The Source; Cascading; Passage; Deluge; In The Mist; Tree Dwellers; Valley Ridge; Reflection
Solitudes - Island Paradise	1996	White Sand; Beachcombing; Cool Rain; Storm Surf; Tropic Moon; Dawn In The Forest; Enchanted Valley; Fluidity
Solitudes - Florida	1996	Florida Dream; Vibrant Shores; Lazy Afternoon; Gentle Sanctuary; Night In The Everglades; Voices Of The Swamp; Celebration
