= Franciszek Surma =

- Born: 1 July 1916; Głębocz, German Empire (present-day Poland)
- Died: 8 November 1941 (aged 25); United Kingdom
- Military career
- Allegiance: Poland; United Kingdom
- Branch: Polish Air Force; Royal Air Force
- Service years: 1932–1941
- Rank: Flying Officer
- Service number: 76713
- Units: Polish 121st Fighter Escadrille; No. 151 Squadron RAF; No. 607 Squadron RAF; No. 257 Squadron RAF; No. 242 Squadron RAF; No. 308 Polish Fighter Squadron
- Conflicts: Polish Defensive War, World War II
- Awards: Virtuti Militari; Cross of Valour

Franciszek Surma (1 July 1916 – 8 November 1941) was a Polish fighter ace of the Polish Air Force in World War II with 5 confirmed kills.

== Biography ==
Surma was born in Głębocz (today part of Gołkowice, Silesia); he was the son of Franciszek and Tekla, née Wodecka. In 1932 he entered the Cadets Corps in Różan, four years later he was admitted to the Polish Air Force Academy in Dęblin. On 15 June 1939 Surma was posted to the Polish 121st Fighter Escadrille in Kraków.

After the September Campaign he crossed the border with Romania, then he was evacuated to France via Liban and finally he reached Britain. After a training in No. 56 OTU Surma was assigned to the No. 151 Squadron RAF with which he took part in the Battle of Britain. On 11 September 1940 he was transferred to the No. 607 Squadron RAF, and on 26 September he shot down a Messerschmitt Bf 109. On 21 October he was ordered to the No. 257 Squadron RAF, one week later he damaged a Heinkel He 111 but was hit himself managing to bale out by parachute. From 12 December he served in the No. 242 Squadron RAF and on 3 March 1941 he arrived in the No. 308 Polish Fighter Squadron. On 11 May 1941 over Great Malvern, his Supermarine Spitfire was hit and begun to burn. Surma had to save himself by jumping with a parachute once again. From 22 July to 12 October he downed four Bf 109. On 8 November escorting bombers near Dunkirk Surma engaged Messerschmitt Bf 109's, during the fight he broke away from his squadron and never returned. His body was never found. He was probably hit by flak.

On 25 May 2002 the school of Gołkowice was named after Franciszek Surma.

== Aerial victory credits ==
- 30 August 1940 He 111 (probably destroyed)
- 26 September 1940 – Bf 109
- 29 October 1940 He 111 (damaged)
- 26 March 1941 1/3 Junkers Ju 88 (probably destroyed)
- 22 July 1941 – Bf 109
- 16 September 1941 – Bf 109
- 20 September 1941 – Bf 109 (and one probably destroyed)
- 27 September 1941 Bf 109 (probably destroyed)
- 12 October 1941 – Bf 109

== Awards ==
Virtuti Militari, Silver Cross
Cross of Valour (Poland), three times
