= Les Surman =

English footballer

Personal information
- Full name: Leslie Surman
- Date of birth: 23 November 1947
- Date of death: 5 December 1978 (aged 31)
- Place of death: Wistaston, Cheshire
- Position: Goalkeeper

Youth career
- –1964: Charlton Athletic

Senior career*
Years	Team	Apps	(Gls)
1964–1966	Charlton Athletic	1	(0)
1966–1967	Rotherham United	1	(0)
1967	Cambridge United		
- * Club domestic league appearances and goals

Leslie Surman (23 November 1947 – 5 December 1978) was an English professional footballer who played in the Football League for Charlton Athletic and Rotherham United. On his Charlton debut in 1965, Surman conceded three goals, and never played for the club again. Surman later played non-league football for Cambridge United, and died in 1978, aged 31.
