= Nature Canada =

Conservation organization focused on Canada

- Founded: 1939; 87 years ago
- Founder: Reginald Whittemore
- Type: Non-profit
- Purpose: Nature conservation, Environmentalism
- Location: Ottawa, Ontario, Canada
- Executive Director: Emily McMillan
- Website: naturecanada.ca

Nature Canada is a member-based environmental organization headquartered in Ottawa, Ontario. Its supporters include more than 100,000 individuals and around 1200 affiliated organizations, including local and provincial naturalist clubs.

The organization's mission is to “protect and conserve wildlife and habitats in Canada by engaging people and advocating on behalf of nature.” Their conservation work is based predominantly on community-based efforts to protect animals, plants and habitat, lobbying for legislation at the federal level to protect endangered species and habitats, and working as a Canadian co-partner for BirdLife International's Important Bird Area (IBA) program.

== History ==
Nature Canada traces its roots back to September 30, 1939, when Reginald Whittemore launched the magazine Canadian Nature in honour of his late wife, Mabel Frances Whittemore. Nature Canada is one of the oldest national nature conservation charity in Canada, after Ducks Unlimited Canada that was founded two years earlier in 1937

In 1948, the organization established itself as the Audubon Society of Canada.

In 1971, the Audubon Society of Canada expanded its mandate beyond bird conservation and re-established itself as the Canadian Nature Federation (CNF).

In 2004, the CNF changed its name to simply Nature Canada.

== Program areas ==
Nature Canada's work focuses on:

- Protected Areas — The government of Canada made a promise to protect 25% of Canada’s land and oceans by 2025, and 30% protection by 2030. Nature Canada has been instrumental in guiding the government’s keystone biodiversity policy, the 2030 Nature Strategy as well as emphasizing the importance of holding the government to its own plans through Nature Accountability Legislation that provides real consequences for failing to meet its targets.
- NatureHood — an urban nature program seeking to connect Canadians living in cities to nature nearby to them. The initial NatureHood pilot project is based in Ottawa, Ontario and Gatineau, Quebec.
- NatureNetwork – the term Nature Canada uses for its network of local Canadian naturalist organizations as well as its provincial affiliates in every province.
- Bird Friendly Cities — Nature Canada is taking a proactive stance to address the decline of birds, species at risk and biodiversity at-large through their Bird Friendly City certification program. Cities, towns, and villages across Canada are showing the way by making impactful changes to become Bird Friendly Certified.
- Rights of Nature — Nature Canada is developing a report to explore the inherent rights of nature and how they could be enshrined and defended within the Canadian legal system.
- Green Budget Coalition — Nature Canada supports and amplifies the calls for strong budget measures to fight climate change and biodiversity loss through the Green Budget Coalition’s annual recommendations.

Nature Canada formerly published a magazine, Canadian Nature, however it discontinued publication in 2004, after 65 years. The organization produced the television show Audubon Wildlife Theatre. The organization produces teacher guides, technical reports, media releases, brochures, information packages and an e-newsletter.

== See also ==
- Ontario Nature
- Bird Studies Canada
- BirdLife International
- International Union for Conservation of Nature
