= Ron Harrison =

English footballer

Personal information
- Full name: Ronald Harrison
- Date of birth: 15 May 1923
- Place of birth: Hebburn, England
- Date of death: July 2004 (aged 81)
- Place of death: Northumberland, England
- Position: Inside forward

Youth career
- –: Newcastle United

Senior career*
Years	Team	Apps	(Gls)
–	Gateshead		
1945–1947	Darlington	8	(3)
1947–1948	Gateshead	6	(1)
–	Ashington		
- * Club domestic league appearances and goals

Ronald Harrison (15 May 1923 – July 2004) was an English footballer who played in the Football League as an inside forward for Darlington and Gateshead, with whom he began his senior career as an amateur during the Second World War. He also played non-league football for Ashington. His career ended after breaking his leg playing for Ashington against West Stanley in the 1st qualifiying round of the FA Cup on the 30th of September 1950.
