= The Philanthropist (journal) =

Academic journal

The Philanthropist is a quarterly academic journal devoted to the legal, management and accounting issues facing charitable and not-for-profit organizations in Canada. It was founded in 1972 as an occasional publication of the Trusts and Estates Section of the Canadian Bar Association - Ontario (now the Ontario Bar Association) in Toronto, Ontario, Canada . The journal's first Editor was Bertha Wilson, later a judge of the Supreme Court of Canada. For a time during the 1980s it was an official publication of the Canadian Centre for Philanthropy (now Imagine Canada). The Philanthropist derives its funding from the Agora Foundation in Toronto. Its content is overseen by a volunteer editorial board drawn from the charitable sector, law, accounting and academia. As of 2010 the journal's current and archived content is available electronically at no charge.
