= Centre for Social Innovation =

- Founded: 2004; 22 years ago
- Purpose: Social Innovation, Social Enterprise, The Next Economy
- Location: Toronto, Ontario, Canada
- Key people: Tonya Surman, CEO
- Website: socialinnovation.org

The Centre for Social Innovation is a social enterprise based in Toronto, Canada. It specializes in the creation of shared workspaces for people or organizations with a social mission. It has two locations in Toronto that serve as shared workspaces, innovation labs and community centres. These buildings offer private offices, private or shared desks, and spaces to hold meetings and events.

== History ==
The Centre for Social Innovation, was founded in 2004 by Tonya Surman of the Commons Group, Margie Zeidler of Urbanspace Property Group, Mary Rowe of Ideas That Matter, Pat Tobin of Canadian Heritage and Eric Meerkamper of DECODE. Its first location, CSI Spadina, opened in the Robertson Building owned and operated by the Urbanspace Property Group.

In 2010, the Centre for Social Innovation bought a 36,000 sq. ft. building with the help of a financing model called community bonds.

In 2012, the Centre for Social Innovation opened CSI Regent Park in the Regent Park neighbourhood, Canada's largest public housing community, currently undergoing Canada's largest community revitalization.

In 2012, the Centre announced it would open a location in New York City in Manhattan's Starrett-Lehigh Building. CSI Starrett-Lehigh opened in 2013.

In October 2014, the Centre bought the 64,000 sq. ft. Murray Building, located right across the street from CSI Spadina. The Centre purchased the building with 'community bonds', which are low-interest loans made by private citizens who agree with the centre's mission and want to help it expand.

== Locations ==
=== Current Locations ===
==== CSI Spadina ====
CSI Spadina opened in 2004 in the Robertson Building at 215 Spadina Ave. in Toronto, Ontario, a historic warehouse building in Toronto's Chinatown district, owned and operated by the Urbanspace Property Group. The Spadina location is home to organizations such as Cycle Toronto, StopGap Foundation, Birth Mark, and more.

=== Former Locations ===
==== CSI Regent Park ====
In September, 2012, CSI opened a 10,000 sq. ft. location in Toronto's Regent Park neighbourhood, on the third floor of the Regent Park Arts & Culture Centre. In October 2020, CSI announced that they were ceasing operations of the Regent Park location.

==== CSI Annex ====
CSI Annex is located at 720 Bathurst Street in Toronto, Ontario. CSI Annex is the Centre's second location and its purchase was financed with the help of community bonds. The building was sold in 2025.

== Organizations ==
CSI's 800 member organizations include nonprofits, charities, for-profits, entrepreneurs and activists working in areas from health and education, to arts and the environment.

== Incubator ==
The Centre for Social Innovation runs an environmental incubator called Climate Ventures, which utilizes entrepreneurial solutions to the climate crisis. Climate Ventures was founded in 2018 and as of 2021, had accelerated 121 early-stage entrepreneurs. Climate Ventures offers programs, a focused community cluster within CSI, and a dedicated co-working space within the building.

== Programming ==
The Centre for Social Innovation offers programming, such as through its Entrepreneurship 101 course, which as of 2021, has trained more than 150 members, and also offers an Agents of Change program, which trains youth in social enterprise while also achieving the United Nations Sustainable Development Goals.
