= Tonya Surman =

Canadian entrepreneur

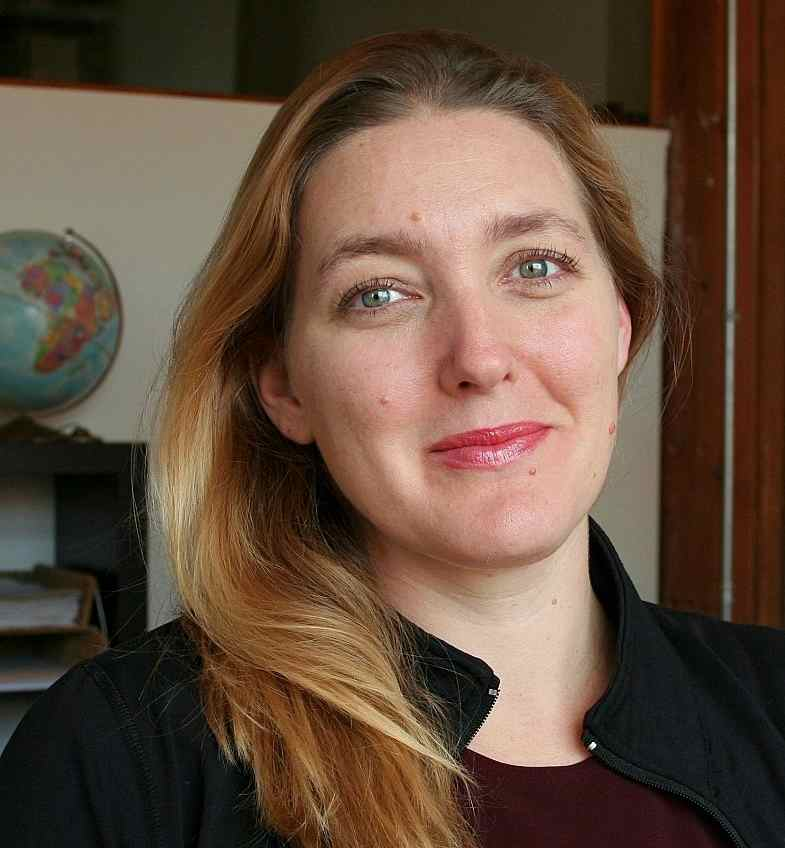
- Born: March 24, 1969 (age 57); London, Ontario
- Education: University of Toronto
- Occupations: Co-Founder and CEO of the Centre for Social Innovation
- Spouse: Mark Surman (divorced)
- Children: Tristan Surman; Ethan Surman
- Website: tonyasurman.ca

Tonya Surman is a Canadian social entrepreneur, and the founding executive director and current CEO of the Centre for Social Innovation.

== Education and early social ventures ==
Surman studied Environmental Studies and International Development at the University of Toronto and has been creating and leading social ventures in Canada since 1987. She was the founding co-chair of the Ontario Nonprofit Network, is a founding trustee in the Awesome Foundation Toronto, and has been active within the Ontario Social Economy Roundtable and the Social Enterprise Council of Canada.

Tonya and husband Mark Surman were instrumental in developing the Constellation Model of Governance, a complexity-inspired framework designed to enable collaborations within dynamic systems. She was the founding Partnership Director of the Canadian Partnership for Children's Health and Environment, a legislative framework to manage chemicals and the banning of BPA in baby bottles.

== Centre for Social Innovation ==
In 2009 Tonya was named a Global Ashoka Fellow. She was recognized for building shared spaces and networks for social innovators designed to foster cooperation. The Centre for Social Innovation has four locations in Toronto and one in New York City. CSI is home to over 700 organizations.

In 2012 Tonya Surman co-authored the book "The Community Bond: An Innovation in Social Finance". The book details the process by which the Centre for Social Innovation raised $2 million through community bonds to purchase and renovate its Annex location. She also co-authored three books on creating shared work spaces for social innovation, and has developed an expertise in the creation of shared spaces for social innovation.

== Personal life ==
Tonya Surman was born in London, Ontario, and currently resides in Toronto.
