= Mitchell Kutney =

Canadian blogger

- Born: May 27, 1985 (age 41); Burlington, Ontario, Canada
- Education: Carleton University
- Occupations: Nonprofit; Blogger
- Writing career
- Genre: Nonprofit

Mitchell Kutney (born May 27, 1985) is an Ottawa-based nonprofit entrepreneur and blogger.

== Background ==
Mitchell Kutney was born in Burlington, Ontario and completed his undergraduate degree in Psychology at the University of Ottawa and his Masters in Public Policy and Administration at Carleton University.

== Career ==
Kutney has been referenced as an "esteemed social sector thinker," particularly in the domain of philanthropy, Social media, millennial giving and charity.

He began his career by spearheading an immigrant youth program in partnership with the University of Ottawa and the City of Ottawa known as Youth Futures. This was a successful program, and was subsequently recognized by the Social Sciences and Humanities Research Council (SSHRC) to serve as a potential best-practice for Ontario. After completing his Masters, Kutney co-founded JustChange Inc., a network of donors who support local, community-based projects. As of 2023, Kutney currently works for the Government of Canada.

== Blogging ==
Kutney is a blogger and progressive pundit. In 2014, Kutney criticized provincial attempts by the New Democratic Party to impose artificial limits on executive compensation within the charitable sector, stating, "compensation should be based on what the job entails, the level of difficulty, and what qualifications you need, not some arcane notion about the morality of the sector in which the leaders are situated." No limits have been imposed to date.

He has also defended the importance of "the personal touch" in engaging young people in politics.

Kutney's work has led to interviews with The Globe and Mail and Ottawa Citizen on the future of sustainable business models, and how social business can contribute to making the city a more fun and exciting place to live. He was also the first blogger to reveal Visa's smallenfreuden viral campaign in Toronto.
