= Philanthropist (award) =

- Awarded for: Outstanding achievements of invalids in the field of culture and art
- Country: Russia
- First award: 1996; 30 years ago
- Website: www.filantrop.ru

Philanthropist is an international award, given to recognize outstanding achievements of invalids in the field of culture and art. "Philanthropist" is awarded once every two years. The history of the award begins in 1996 at the forum of the Russian Youth Chamber. In 1997 it was registered in the Russian Authors' Society. It is awarded in categories "Performing Arts", "Artistic Creativity", "Literary Creativity", as well as "For the Preservation of Folk Art Traditions", "For Novelty and Originality in Creativity", "Overcoming. Beyond the Limit of Possible","Growing Hopes","State and public figure for rendering effective assistance to disabled people and their social organizations". The organizers of the award are: Government of Russia, Chamber of Commerce and Industry of the Russian Federation, Government of Moscow, Russian Academy of Arts, All-Russian Society of Invalids. Mikhail Zhvanetsky, Alexander Lomakin-Rumyantsev, Igor Luchenok, Sergey Mironov, Alexander Neumyvakin, Vladimir Platonov, Oleg Smolin, Zurab Tsereteli, Mikhail Shvydkoy, Neil Young are on the Board of Trustees.
