= Tagged Message Delivery Agent =

Junk email filter

Tagged Message Delivery Agent (TMDA) is an open-source software application designed to reduce the amount of junk email a user receives. TMDA's main difference from other anti-spam systems is the use of a challenge/response system that bulk mailing machines and programs are either unwilling (to save bandwidth) or unable (due to lack of programming) to answer.

The technical countermeasures used by TMDA to thwart spam include:

- Whitelists: Whitelists are essentially an ‘accept list’. All messages from addresses in these lists are automatically allowed through no matter what the content is.
- Blacklists: Blacklists are a ‘block list’. All messages from addresses in these lists are automatically blocked.
- Challenge/response (C/R): A controversial system in which challenge emails are sent to unfamiliar sending addresses in an attempt to validate those addresses and their associated emails. Legitimate senders who are not yet approved are thus tasked with an additional “response” effort in sending mail. Also, as spam is often crafted with forged sending addresses, people, otherwise unrelated to the incident, may be sent spurious challenges — a form of backscatter.
- Tagged addresses: Special-purpose e-mail addresses such as time-dependent addresses, or addresses which only accept certain kinds of communication. These increase the transparency of TMDA for unknown senders by allowing them to safely circumvent the challenge/response system.
