= Postmaster (computing) =

Administrator of an email server

In electronic mail, a postmaster is the administrator of a mail server. Nearly every domain should have an e-mail address like postmaster@example.com where errors in e-mail processing are directed. Error e-mails automatically generated by mail servers' MTAs usually appear to have been sent from the postmaster address.

Every domain that supports the SMTP protocol for electronic mail is required by RFC 5321 and, as early as 1982, by RFC 822. Due to how common this address is across mail servers, it is a common target for spam.

== Specification ==
RFC 5321, which defines the Simple Mail Transfer Protocol, specifies that all mail servers featuring the ability to relay or deliver email must have a "postmaster" mailbox, and that the postmaster should receive all mail sent to it in as much as possible (except, for example, in case of a denial-of-service attack). Email send to the postmaster mailbox must also be received by a real person who's capable of handling issues with the mail server.

Unless the mail server has a real account called "postmaster," the postmaster mailbox should be defined as an e-mail alias that expands to the address of a real user on the mail server.

== Use ==
The purpose of the postmaster mailbox is to receive messages about issues with the mail server that hosts it. This mailbox follows the same pattern as the hostmaster and webmaster addresses, which are intended to receive DNS and web-related complaints respectively.

For example, if email sent to another server is bounced, the receiving server may notify the sending server by sending a message to its postmaster. Mail programs are typically designed to notify the postmaster automatically when they detect problems, and users can also use this mailbox to notify the administrator of a mail server about issues on their own.

It is convention to send copies of bounced emails to the postmaster mailbox, however this is optional. Sending the postmaster all bounced emails can pose privacy concerns for users, so some mail servers first pass all such messages through a filter to remove the e-mail's body, preserving only the headers to diagnose issues

Since most domains have a postmaster address, it is commonly targeted by spamming operations. Even if not directly spammed, a postmaster address may be sent bounced spam from other servers that mistakenly trust fake return-paths commonly used in spam.

== See also ==
- Webmaster
- Moderator (communications)
- Forum administrator
- Sysop
- Superuser

== Bibliography ==
- Klensin, John C. (October 2008). RFC 5321 - Simple Mail Transfer Protocol. IETF. doi:10.17487/RFC5321. RFC 5321. Archived from the original on 2025-01-01.
- Lucas, Michael (2024). Run Your Own Mail Server. Tilted Windmill Press. ISBN 978-1-64235-078-4.
- Costales, Bryan; Jansen, George; Assmann, Claus (2008). sendmail (4th ed.). O'Reilly Media. ISBN 978-0-596-51029-9.
