= Sender Address Verification =

Sender Address Verification may refer to two distinct anti-spam techniques:

- Callback verification, also known as callout verification
- Challenge–response spam filtering
