= PrintWithMe =

PrintWithMe LLC
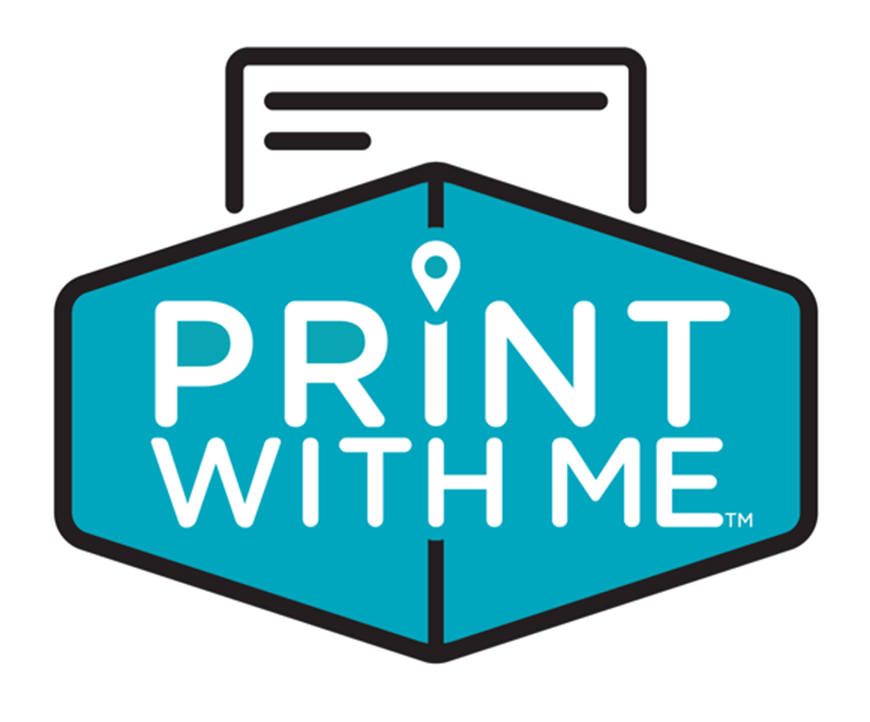
- Company type: Private
- Industry: Printing, Technology
- Founded: 2014
- Founder: Jonathan Treble (CEO)
- Headquarters: Chicago, U.S.
- Area served: North America
- Services: printing
- Parent: WithMe, Inc.
- Website: printwithme.com

PrintWithMe LLC is an American company with the first network of printer kiosks in public spaces such as coffee shops, apartment buildings, and co-working spaces. PrintWithMe is headquartered in Chicago and is a wholly owned subsidiary of WithMe, Inc.

== Company history ==
PrintWithMe was founded in 2014 by Jonathan Treble (CEO) in Chicago. In November 2016, PrintWithMe raised $800,000 in seed funding. The financing was led by Network Ventures with participation from M25 Group, New Stack Ventures, and Little Engine Venture. As of 2021, they have printer kiosks in over 2,000 locations in all 50 states, and have recorded over five million printed pages. In 2021, Treble rebranded the company PrintWithMe as WithMe. Along with printing operations, WithMe, in 2024 launched a self-service coffee station.

== PrintWithMe kiosks ==
The typical PrintWithMe kiosk looks like a standard grey printer with branded signage. Users can print by sending documents as an attachment to a printer's email address and then pay online. PrintWithMe utilizes cloud technology that encrypts and later deletes the documents. PrintWithMe makes money either by charging users fees to print per page or by subscription fees for businesses.
