= Graymail (email) =

Solicited bulk email

Graymail is solicited bulk email messages that don't fit the definition of email spam (e.g., the recipient "opted into" receiving them). Recipient interest in this type of mailing tends to diminish over time, increasing the likelihood that recipients will report graymail as spam. In some cases, graymail can account for up to 82 percent of the average user's email inbox. Graymail was described in 2007 and 2008 by researchers at Microsoft Research looking to improve spam filtering as “messages that could reasonably be considered either spam or good (by different email users)” hence the name “graymail” was chosen to signify the subjective nature of the classification. A 2008 paper presented at the Fifth annual Conference on Email and Anti-Spam (CEAS) describes graymail as "messages (such as email newsletters) that some users value and others prefer to block". In 2011 a report by The Radicati Group referred to graymail as "newsletters or notifications that a user may have signed up for at one time but no longer wants to receive".

== Traits ==
Graymail differs from spam and can be identified by one or more of the following traits:

- Solicited. The recipient requested to receive the email message by opting in, either directly or indirectly via an automatic or non-obvious mechanism, such as supplying an email address when registering for an online shopping account. In contrast, spam email messages are generally accepted to be unsolicited.
- Legitimate. Though they may be sale notices, coupons, social updates and the like, graymail messages are sent by reputable sources who value their relationship with the recipient. They will typically contain an unsubscribe option, with the sender honoring such requests.
- Content value. Graymail messages generally contain content that is targeted to the recipient or their interests as opposed to spam email messages which are indiscriminate bulk distribution of unwanted solicitations, offers and information.

In addition there is often a timeliness component to graymail whereby the utility of the message expires or becomes out of date after a period of time. Shopping deals are a good example: they’re only valid for a fixed number of hours or days but are frequently not read or opened by the recipient until after the offer has expired.

== See also ==
- Greylisting
