= Backscatter (disambiguation) =

Backscatter is the reflection of waves, particles or signals. The term may also refer to:

- Backscatter X-ray, a new type of imaging technology
- Backscatter (DDOS), a side effect of denial-of-service attacks on computer resources
- Backscatter (email), a side effect of e-mail spam, viruses or worms
- Backscatter (photography), the orb-like image of an out-of-focus particle in a camera's flash
