= Greylisting =

Greylisting can refer to:

- Greylisting (email), a method of defending e-mail users against spam
- Greylisting (employment), a form of blacklisting for lesser offenses
- Hollywood graylist, people who were on the Hollywood blacklist operated by the major studios, but could find work at minor film studios on Poverty Row
