= Geobytes =

US based geolocation and anti-spam software company

Geobytes is a global company that provides geolocation and anti-spam software. Geobytes was incorporated in Delaware, US in 1999.

== History ==
Geobytes was one of the first companies to build a global IP address location database by overlaying geographic user data on to a map of the internet's infrastructure. Geobyte licenses spam management tools to various email providers and software vendors.

The company's technology has been cited in numerous government and legal documents as ‘evidence’ that ‘Geolocation’ of the Internet is possible. Geobytes’ technology has also been used in both civil and criminal court proceedings, in law enforcement, and in the location of missing persons. The company was founded in 1999 and originally catered to the online advertising industry.

=== Pre-incorporation ===
Adrian McElligott thought of mapping the Internet and targeted adverts whilst promoting an email notification tool that he had developed. He wanted to limit the marketing of this product to certain geographic regions, and he did this using the available ad-serving technology of the day. This discovery led to the commencement of the NetWorldMap project in July 1999, and later that year to the foundation of the Geobytes Technology Project.

=== Incorporation ===
Geobytes, Inc. started as a global Internet Business-to-Business (B2B) technology company, primarily servicing the needs of the Internet advertising industry. The company was incorporated in Delaware in December 1999. The principal shareholders of the company were, and still are the founders, together holding 90% of the issued shares. A further 8% is held by other individuals who were involved in the project's early development. The remaining 2% is held by the company's original seed investor.

The company's legal representatives are in Seattle. Its US office is in Nevada, and its Web servers are located in Dallas/Fort Worth, Texas. The company's executive and research and development operations are based in Brisbane, Australia.

After the dot-com bubble burst on March 10, 2000, in response to the downturn in the internet advertising industry, Geobytes diversified into other geo-niches such as fraud prevention, site analytics, geographic site customization and regulatory compliance. In mid-2002 Geobytes launched its GeoSelect product suite.

In April 2003, Geobytes’ CEO invented CaseKeys and Spamborder technologies to address the problem of spam filtering Type I and type II errors, and Geobytes incorporated this new technology into a new spam filter.

In May 2004, Geobytes improved its infrastructure-mapping technology to overcome the limitations of the previous ICMP-based techniques that were used previously. The new technique uses packet-cloning technology that can "see through" modern stateful Internet routers.

== Technology ==
Geobytes' technologies fall into two main groups; geolocation services and anti-spam technologies. There is some overlap between the two groups, however their product utilizes geolocation technology to detect the geographic origins of emails.

=== Geolocation software ===
Geobyte provides a geolocation service, identifying users' locations by their IP addresses. The data used to compile the company's database is gathered from a large number of websites that require users to enter their location information. This is then processed by a set of algorithms that overlay this data onto Geobytes' infrastructure map of the Internet creating a global database that can be used to map IP addresses to geographical locations. The GeoNetMap system does not use WHOIS data, DNS reverse-lookups or cookies; it relies totally on its own proprietary IP address location database. City accuracy is less consistent and can vary considerably from country to country.

==== Sender Authorization System ====
Geobyte provides technology to implement a "Sender Authorization System" intended to reduce the need for any special software or action to be installed or performed by the sender. The software uses a system that uses a combination of lower and upper case letters to encode email addresses with a unique key.

The concept is that CaseKeys software is installed on either the client PC or the mail server which allows every message – both incoming and outgoing to be intercepted and processed. Outgoing messages are processed with each instance of the protected user's email address being encoded with a unique key. The CaseKey encoding, the message recipient, and optionally other details of the outgoing message are then recorded. In the other direction, incoming messages are scanned for any CaseKey-encoded instances of the protected user's email address, with the recovered CaseKey codes being authenticated against the list of those previously issued. Messages found to contain valid CaseKeys are then marked as not spam to prevent spam filters from misrouting the message to the user's junk folder. Other details may be included with the message, such as who the original message was issued to and when it was issued.
