= Sender Rewriting Scheme =

Rewriting an email message sender address

The Sender Rewriting Scheme (SRS) is a scheme for bypassing the Sender Policy Framework's (SPF) methods of preventing forged sender addresses. Forging a sender address is also known as email spoofing.

== Background ==
In a number of cases, including change of email address and mailing lists, a message transfer agent (MTA) accepts an email message that is not destined to a local mailbox but needs to be forwarded. In such cases, the question arises of who should receive any related bounce message. Generally, that is the author, or a person or other entity who administers the forwarding itself. Sending bounces to the author is administratively simpler and was previously accomplished by keeping the original envelope sender. However, if the author address is subject to a strict SPF policy (-all) and the target MTA enforces SPF, the forwarding transaction can be rejected.

As a workaround, it is possible to synthesize a temporary bounce address on the fly that will direct any bounce back to the current MTA. The scheme provides a way to recover the original envelope address so that if a bounce does arrive, it can be forwarded along the reverse path, but this time with an empty envelope sender.

While there are other workarounds, SRS is a fairly general one. Its notion of reversing the path resembles the original routing dispositions for email, see below.

Using the SRS protocol will fail the SPF Alignment check on DMARC records by design. DMARC records can still pass with a DKIM check.

== Historical background ==
Historically, all mail transfer agents (MTAs) added their host name to the reverse path. In the Simple Mail Transfer Protocol (SMTP) this reverse path is also known as MAIL FROM, but paths were also used before and outside of SMTP, e.g. as bang paths in UUCP and Usenet (Net-News). All news articles still contain a Path header, example:

Path: news.server.example!other.example!not-for-mail

The same information in an RFC 5321 e-mail envelope - that is the SMTP info like MAIL FROM - would be:

1. MAIL FROM:<not-for-mail@other.example>
2. MAIL FROM:<@news.server.example:not-for-mail@other.example>

The 1st step reflects the sender, the 2nd step the next MTA, etc. In this example, the 2nd MTA forwards the mail to a 3rd MTA, where it is finally delivered. The final MTA is also known as Mail delivery agent (MDA), putting the mail into the mailbox of the recipient. The MDA transforms the reverse path into the known Return-Path header field:

Return-Path:<@news.server.example:not-for-mail@other.example>

SMTP uses MX records for its forward routing. Explicit source routes as in...

RCPT TO:<@news.server.example:user@destination.example>

...to route mail from other.example via MTA news.server.example to MDA destination.example were cumbersome. In some cases, the new (1982) style of addresses was mixed with old UUCP bang paths in constructs like...

destination.example!user@news.server.example
other.example!not-for-mail@news.server.example

...and various other kludges. SMTP and MX records rendered this method unnecessary. Therefore, source routing was deprecated in 1989 in RFC 1123.

One special case in RFC 1123 are gateways from or to other networks like UUCP and NetNews, where the first sending MTA cannot reach the final receiver directly with TCP. It is solved by MX records and if necessary rewriting foreign addresses at the gateway. "MX" is an abbreviation for "Mail eXchanger".

Another special case are mailing lists, where the list server rewrites all reverse paths to its own error handling address for bounces (error messages) by recipients. The list server could automatically unsubscribe bouncing recipients. This type of address rewriting is known since RFC 821 and still used today (RFC 5321, as well as RFC 2821, updated the SMTP chapter in RFC 1123).

Forwarding to another address has always worked by rewriting the address in the forward path also known as RCPT TO, if and only if the forwarding MTA accepted the responsibility for both forwarding the mail and returning potential bounce messages to the sender. RFC 821 and all later SMTP specifications offer two result codes for this situation:

- 251 user not local (attempted forward)
- 551 user not local (mail rejected)

For privacy reasons, these result codes are today rarely used; they include the forwarded to (251) or not forwarded to (551) address.

As noted, RFC 1123 deprecated source routing, thus implicitly deprecating the reverse routing of bounces.

Since RFC 1123, forwarders to third parties still rewrite the RCPT TO address, but keep the MAIL FROM as is. As a side effect, MTAs wishing to accept mail from forwarders generally accept any MAIL FROM address.

RFC 5321, as well as RFC 2821, states that non-delivery reports (bounces) must be sent to the originator as indicated in the reverse path after an MTA accepted the responsibility for delivery. However, the bounce message may be suppressed when the original content is hostile (cf. spam or virus mail) or the message is forged (RFC 5321, Section 6). Note that all current forgery detection methods require the mailbox owner to supply information for them to work. Failing to supply the criteria should not make any bounce message classifiable as backscatter, although some people mistakenly think it should.

Open relays and forwarders generally cannot guarantee that the MAIL FROM address indicates the originator, and cannot guarantee that final delivery will succeed.

This SMTP problem caused as a side effect of RFC 1123 is addressed by SPF.

Receivers can arrange their forwarding in a way that works with SPF with a variety of strategies:

1. not checking SPF behind their border, e.g. white list forwarders
2. rejectingSPF FAIL, resulting in a bounce (SMTP error 550)
3. rewriting the MAIL FROM at the forwarder (as done by mailing lists)

Sender Rewriting Scheme (SRS) is one way for the third strategy.

== See also ==
- Sender Policy Framework (SPF)
- Bounce message (SMTP non-delivery report)
- Bounce Address Tag Validation (BATV)
- Simple Mail Transfer Protocol (SMTP)
