= Mailwasher =

Email filtering software

- Developer: Firetrust
- Stable release: 7.15.20 / January 1, 2025; 20 months ago
- Operating system: Microsoft Windows
- Size: 27.85 MB
- Type: Email filterer
- License: Freeware
- Website: www.mailwasher.net

Mailwasher is an email filtering software for Windows that can detect and delete spam from a user's email when it is on the mail server, before being downloaded to the user's computer.

Mailwasher was developed by the New Zealand–based company Firetrust. It uses a combination of user defined filters, spam databases and Bayesian filtering. The filter works on a small portion of each email, and then allows unwanted emails to be directly deleted from the user's POP3 inbox, without downloading them to the email client on the user's computer. This approach is intended to prevent the downloading of spam and other messages infected with malware.

There are two versions of the program. The free version can access only a single mail account and does not contain the Bayesian learning filter. The Pro version can access multiple accounts and has additional features.
