= Email storm =

Spike of "reply all" messages on an email distribution list

An email storm (also called a reply all storm, sometimes reply allpocalypse, or more generally a notification storm) is a sudden spike of "reply all" messages on an email distribution list, usually caused by a controversial or misdirected message. Such storms can start when even one member of the distribution list replies to the entire list at the same time in response to an instigating message. When other members respond, pleading for the cessation of messages, asking to be removed from the list, or adding vitriol to the discussion this triggers a chain reaction of email messages. The sheer load of traffic generated by these storms can render the email servers inoperative, similar to a distributed denial-of-service attack.

Some email viruses also have the capacity to create email storms by sending copies of themselves to an infected user's contacts, including distribution lists, infecting the contacts in turn.

== Examples ==
- On 31 March 1987, Jordan Hubbard, using rwall, intended to message every machine at UC Berkeley, but the message was sent to every machine on the Internet listed in /etc/hosts. This message was not an email.
- On 14 October 1997, a Microsoft employee noticed that they were on the as-yet unknown email distribution list "Bedlam DL3" and emailed the list asking to be removed. This list contained approximately a quarter of the company's employees, 13,000 email addresses. Other users replied to the list with similar requests and some with requests to stop replying to the list. A Microsoft employee estimates that 15 million emails were sent, generating 195 GB of traffic.
- On 3 October 2007, an email storm was generated at the U.S. Department of Homeland Security, causing more than 2.2 million messages to be sent and exposing the names of hundreds of security professionals.
- In early 2009, U.S. State Department employees were warned they could face disciplinary action for taking part in a massive email storm that "nearly knocked out one of the State Department's main electronic communications systems".
- In November 2012, New York University experienced a reply-all email storm with 39,979 subscribed addresses affected due to an older listserv-based mailing list.
- On 18 September 2013, a Cisco employee sent an email to a "sep_training1" mailing list containing 23,570 members requesting that an online training be performed. The resulting storm of more than four million reply emails, many of which were requests to unsubscribe and facepalm images, generated over 375 GB of network traffic and an estimated $600,000 of lost productivity. The following month on 23 October 2013, a nearly identical email storm occurred when an employee sent a message to a Cisco group containing 34,562 members. The thread was flooded with "remove me from the list", "me too", "please don't reply-all", and even a pizza recipe.
- On 24 January 2014, BP experienced an email storm that eventually took down the mail servers, when an employee sent an inquiry to the whole "OMS Navigator Users" distribution list consisting of many hundreds of people.
- On 8 October 2014, an email storm of over 3,000 messages, including both spam and student comments, reached University College London's 26,000 students. Dubbed "Bellogate", the email chain was started by a prank email sent from an anonymous user pretending to be the provost.
- On 26 August 2015, Thomson Reuters, a media and information firm, experienced a "reply all" email storm reaching out to over 33,000 employees. Seven hours later, the original email resulted in nearly 23 million emails. The storm was initiated by an employee located in the Philippines requesting his phone to be re-activated. Employees from all over the globe took to social media trending the hashtag #ReutersReplyAllGate.
- On 2 October 2015, Atos, a European IT services corporation, experienced a "reply all" email storm. In about one hour, 379 emails were sent to an email distribution list with 91,053 employees, leading to more than 34.5 million emails. The storm was initiated by an employee located in India, requesting a password reset for a machine.
- On 14 November 2016, at least 840,000 employees of the United Kingdom's National Health Service (out of a total of 1.2 million employees) were sent a 'test e-mail' by a Croydon-based IT contractor, resulting in an estimated total of 186 million e-mails generated during the reply-all email storm.
- On 7 December 2018, the Utah state government experienced an email storm originating in a holiday potluck invite that was mistakenly sent to 25,000 state employees, nearly the entire state workforce. Utah Lieutenant Governor Spencer Cox called it "an emergency".
- On 24 January 2019, a misconfiguration involving the “@Microsoft/everyone group” on GitHub led to a large volume of notification emails being sent to Microsoft employees. Replying to these notifications inadvertently resubscribed users, exacerbating the issue.
- On 28 May 2019, an employee at the United States House of Representatives sent out a message to an email group called "Work Place Rights 2019". The group contained every single House employee's contact. The email replies lasted over two hours.
- On 3 June 2022, a user made a pull request to a GitHub repository belonging to the Epic Games organization, tagging several of the organization's teams. Notifications were delivered to members of the tagged teams, sending emails to around 400,000 members of the tagged "EpicGames/developers" team in the process. Furthermore, some individuals received an additional 150 notifications as a result of the ensuing comments submitted in response to the request. Epic Games uses GitHub to distribute source code for its Unreal Engine game engine and grants access to the private repositories by adding users to the "EpicGames/developers" team, accounting for its unusually large number of members compared to other GitHub organizations.
- On 8 September 2023, an emergency drill held in the United States Senate led to an email storm when users who were asked to give their location used "reply all" to the entire Senate.
- On 9 November 2024, a misconfigured email list at Miami University resulted in students receiving hundreds of emails from others asking to be removed from the list, alongside other memes.

== See also ==
- Etiquette in technology
- Information overload
- Blind carbon copy
