= Ezmlm =

Mailing list management software

ezmlm
- Original author: D.J. Bernstein
- Final release: 0.53 / June 30, 1997; 28 years ago
- Written in: C
- Operating system: Linux, Unix-like systems
- Type: Mailing list management (MLM) software
- License: public domain
- Website: cr.yp.to/ezmlm.html

ezmlm-idx
- Original authors: Fred Lindberg; Fred B. Ringel
- Developer: Bruce Guenter
- Final release: 7.2.2 / May 15, 2014; 11 years ago
- Written in: C
- Operating system: Linux, Unix-like systems
- Type: Mailing list management (MLM) software
- License: GPL2
- Website: ezmlm.org
- Repository: github.com/bruceg/ezmlm-idx

ezmlmx
- Stable release: 0.69 / September 11, 2025; 8 months ago
- Website: fehcom.de//ipnet/ezmlmx.html

ezmlm (indimail)
- Stable release: 1.2 / August 7, 2024; 21 months ago
- Website: github.com/indimail/ezmlm

ezmlm-idx (indimail)
- Stable release: 7.2.4 / August 24, 2025; 8 months ago
- Website: github.com/indimail/ezmlm-idx

ezmlm is mailing list management software (MLM) by Daniel J. Bernstein. It is similar to GNU Mailman and Majordomo but only works with the qmail mail transfer agent. It is released into the public domain. The latest version, 0.53, came out in 1997.

The related program ezmlm-idx originated as an add-on to ezmlm. It now exists as a complete package on its own, but can still be considered essentially as an extension to ezmlm. It adds multi-message threaded message retrieval from the archive, digests, message and subscription moderation, and a number of remote administration functions. The latest version, 7.2.2, was released May 15, 2014.

== Features ==
ezmlm provides all of the common electronic mailing list functionality: moderated lists, automated subscription and unsubscription, and digest creation. ezmlm takes advantage of the features of qmail to enable ordinary users to create and to manage mailing lists, without need for superuser privileges.

Unlike some other mailing list management software, ezmlm's user interface is command-based. The mailing list administrator usually does not have to edit files. For example, the command to create a new mailing list is:

ezmlm-make ~/list ~/.qmail-list `whoami`-list host

and the commands to (manually) subscribe someone to and unsubscribe someone from that list are:

ezmlm-sub ~/list mailbox

and:

ezmlm-unsub ~/list mailbox

The operation of each individual mailing list is controlled by files in the list's directory (~/list in the given example). That directory also contains an archive of all messages sent to the list.

Whether a list is moderated or not is controlled by the existence of a file in the list's directory, named public. In the given example, this file would be ~/list/public. If the file exists, the list is not moderated, and anyone can subscribe to and unsubscribe from the mailing list by sending (empty) electronic mail messages to special -subscribe and -unsubscribe electronic mailboxes. If the file does not exist, the list is moderated, and only the list owner can change subscriptions using the ezmlm-sub and ezmlm-unsub commands. The ezmlm-idx extension provides more moderation mechanisms.

Standard ezmlm does not include a web interface, but the ezmlm-web extension provides that functionality.

Ezmlm's speed comes from its use of database type files, whereas many other mailing list managers use flat ascii files.

== See also ==
- Electronic mailing list
- List of mailing list software
