= Blind carbon copy =

Email functionality

A blind carbon copy (abbreviated Bcc) is a message copy sent to an additional recipient, without the primary recipient being made aware. This concept originally applied to paper correspondence and now also applies to email. "Bcc" can also stand for "blind courtesy copy" as a backronym of the original abbreviation.

In some circumstances, the typist creating a paper correspondence must ensure that multiple recipients of such a document do not see the names of other recipients. To achieve this, the typist can:

- Add the names in a second step to each copy, without carbon paper;
- Set the ribbon not to strike the paper, which leaves names off the top copy (but may leave letter impressions on the paper).

With email, recipients of a message are specified using addresses in any of these three fields:

- To: Primary recipients
- Cc: Carbon copy to secondary recipients
- Bcc: Blind carbon copy to tertiary recipients who receive the message. The primary and secondary recipients cannot see the tertiary recipients. Depending on email software, the tertiary recipients may only see their own email address in Bcc, or they may see the email addresses of all primary and secondary recipients but will not see other tertiary recipients.

It is common practice to use the Bcc: field when addressing a very long list of recipients, or a list of recipients who should not (necessarily) know each other, e.g. in mailing lists.

== SMTP mechanism ==
BCC in email is handled uniquely by the Simple Mail Transfer Protocol. Here BCC recipients are managed by specifying all recipients using the RCPT TO command, without distinguishing between To, CC, or BCC fields. The SMTP "envelope" includes each recipient, including those in BCC, but only To and CC recipients appear in the email headers visible to recipients. Provided SMTP servers respect this, this setup keeps BCC addresses hidden from end recipients, but allows each recipient to receive the email, as they are omitted from the email’s header information shown in email clients, while still being included in the SMTP delivery commands used to send the email. Consequently, email clients display only the listed To and CC recipients, preserving the privacy of BCC recipients.

== Benefits ==
There are a number of reasons for using this feature:

- Bcc is often used to prevent an accidental "Reply All" from sending a reply intended for only the originator of the message to the entire recipient list. Using Bcc can prevent an email storm from happening.
- To send a copy of one's correspondence to a third party (for example, a colleague) when one does not want to let the recipient know that this is being done (or when one does not want the recipient to know the third party's e-mail address, assuming the other recipient is in the To: or Cc: fields).
- To send a message to multiple parties with none of them knowing the other recipients. This can be accomplished by addressing a message to oneself (or, in some email clients, leaving the To: field empty) and filling in the actual intended recipients in the Bcc: field.
- To tighten the focus of an existing email correspondence. By "moving people to BCC," a sender can remove non-essential parties from the recipient list so that future reply-all's will not include them. It is customary to include a parenthetical note indicating that certain recipients have been moved to BCC. This can be done out of courtesy to uninterested parties, or as a way of politely cutting off non-essential parties from the thread going forward.
- To prevent the spread of computer viruses, spam, and malware by avoiding the accumulation of block-list e-mail addresses available to all Bcc: recipients, which often occurs in the form of chain letters.

== Disadvantages ==
In some cases, the use of blind carbon copy may be viewed as mildly unethical. The original addressee of the mail (To: address) is left under the impression that communication is proceeding between the known parties, and is knowingly kept unaware of others participating in the primary communication.

A related risk is that by (unintentional) use of "reply to all" functionality by someone on Bcc, the original addressee is (inadvertently) made aware of this participation. For this reason, it is in some cases better to separately forward the original e-mail.

Depending on the particular email software used, the recipient may or may not know that the message has been sent via Bcc. In some cases, 'undisclosed recipients' placed in the To: line (by the software) shows that Bcc has been used. In other cases, the message appears identical to one sent to a single addressee. The recipient does not necessarily see the email address (and real name, if any) originally placed in the To: line.

When it is useful for the recipients to know who else has received a Bcc message:

- their real names, but not their email addresses, can be listed in the body of the message, or
- a meaningful substitute for the names can be placed in the body of the message, e.g. '[To General Manager and members of Remunerations Committee]', or '[To the whole Bloggs family]'.
