= Bounce address =

Email address to which bounce messages are delivered

A bounce address is an email address to which bounce messages are delivered.A bounce address, also known as an envelope sender or return path, is the address that will receive email delivery-failure notifications. SMTP uses MAIL FROM to designate the sender address, which can be different from the address in the From: line in the message.

== See also ==
- Email forwarding
- Variable envelope return path
- Sender Rewriting Scheme
