= Businesses and organizations in Second Life =

In the virtual world of Second Life, there are a number of in-world business and user-groups founded specifically for the game, some of which have become legal entities in their own right, as well as preexisting companies and organizations that have involved themselves in the world.

== Originating from Second Life ==
These businesses and organizations are legally registered or recognized entities created specifically for Second Life. Groups affiliated with preexisting organizations are in the Operated inside Second Life section.

=== Aimee Weber Studio ===
Aimee Weber Studio Inc. has provided services for several real-world business, including National Oceanic and Atmospheric Administration, United Nations, American Cancer Society, American Apparel, Warner Bros., NBC and Save the Children.

=== Anshe Chung Studios ===
Anshe Chung is the main avatar (online personality) of Ailin Graef in the online world Second Life. Referred to as the "Rockefeller of Second Life" by a CNN journalist, she has built an online business that engages in development, brokerage, and arbitrage of virtual land, items, and currencies, and has been featured in a number of prominent magazines such as Business Week, Fortune and Red Herring.

=== Exakt – Made in Sweden ===
EXAKT - Made in Sweden is run by Tina Bergman since February 2005. It specializes in lighting and in 50-60 style of architecture. It is based in Stockholm, Sweden.

=== Second Life Left Unity ===
Second Life Left Unity (SLLU) is an international socialist and anti-capitalist organisation which operates entirely within Second Life. Originally established by members of the Scottish Socialist Party, and other left activists, it challenged the Front National when it attempted to establish a base within the virtual reality world, demanding that they were only allowed to operate in adult areas of the game. More recently it has also supported IBM workers in Italy protesting against low pay.

=== The Electric Sheep Company ===
The Electric Sheep Company is a design, building and scripting firm that creates content for three-dimensional online worlds. Originating in Second Life, they have done work on the Virtual Laguna Beach project for MTV, Aloft Hotels, and Sony BMG Music, as well as creating the OnRez version fork of the client software.

=== World Stock Exchange ===
World Stock Exchange (WSE) is a virtual securities exchange developed for use in the virtual world of Second Life. The exchange provides Second Life companies with the ability to raise capital from the global investment market using the in-world fictional Linden currency and the new World Internet Currency(WIC).

The WSE has been surrounded by controversy since it began operation. Due to the difficulty in regulating "companies" that trade on the exchange, there have been a number of "CEOs" who have run off with IPO funds, leaving investors with nothing. Other issues, such as security and downtime have plagued the exchange, including the theft of funds by an "employee" who "hacked" the system and left with stored funds.

== Operated inside Second Life ==
These are businesses and organizations originating in real life that have operated in Second Life and were not founded specifically for Second Life, but have involved themselves in the world.

=== 0–9 ===
- 20th Century Fox held a premiere for X-Men: The Last Stand in Second Life.

=== A–F ===
- ABN AMRO Bank has opened a virtual branch in Second Life.
- Adidas Reebok have created a permanent presence in Second Life.
- American Apparel opened a branch inside the virtual world selling digital renderings of clothing modeled after real-life merchandise.
- American Cancer Society has held a version of its Relay For Life national fundraising event inside Second Life.
- BBC Radio 1 recreated the 2006 One Big Weekend event on a 64-acre (260,000 m^{2}) virtual island in Second Life.
- Bigpond has created 11 islands called "The Pond" for their broadband, cable and ADSL members.
- Centric, an advertising agency based in Los Angeles, opened its Second Life office in October 2006. Centric has also started a de-advertising campaign by buying adspace in Second Life and turning it into public parks.
- Cisco has a 4-sim presence in Second Life to promote products and demonstrations along with live presentations and was designed by SL Brand.
- Colonius Colonius, a direct replica of the telecommunications-tower in Cologne, was created by rapidSL Development in Second Life.
- Creative Commons is building a community in Second Life around Creative Commons licenses and standards through events and projects in the virtual world.
- Crescendo Design uses Second Life to help clients visualize residential design concepts and to educate them about the value of sustainable design principles.
- Dell sells PCs in Second Life.
- depo consulting ltd, a management consultancy specialising in the Internet and new media, were notable in that they closed their physical office to run their business using a Second Life office. Their in-world services have included design, build and events for clients including Field Fisher Waterhouse, Informa and the BBC. They blog on their experiences in Second Life and social media.
- Disney employed Second Life resident Fizik Baskerville (and others in his team) to create content based on production designer's specs for the films The Hitchhiker's Guide to the Galaxy, Pirates of the Caribbean Pirates of the Caribbean: Dead Man's Chest and Pirates of the Caribbean: At World's End and The Chronicles of Narnia
- Rheinturm Düsseldorf Tower was created in Second Life by Beatenetworks
- Endemol has created a version of Big Brother in Second Life.
- Enel launched its own island in Second Life in July 2007, Enel Park, with power plants projects under construction in real life, moto and racing circuit, movie theater, contest and engaging games, commercial area and offices. Enel Park can show how the future of energy will be and the prospective of a real sustainable development. On the Hydrogen Park, thanks to Enel sponsor of Ducati Bike, all users can drive a moto with the real sound of its engine.
- Faber Maunsell is an engineering consultancy firm that is currently developing a space within Second Life to be able to display the buildings that they design. Faber Maunsell is also looking to use Second Life as a marketing tool.
- Forward Together, the PAC headed by former Virginia Governor Mark Warner, is integrating Second Life into its campaign strategy.

=== G–L ===
- Property Solutions created the Gabetti Island containing the company Headquarters and a perfect replica of one of the houses they sell in Real Life (RL): the aim of the presence is communicate the brand in foreign markets and develop a virtual business strategy by buying, selling and intermediating digital real estate properties.
- Graphico are a creative digital design and development agency that works with clients at strategic levels for their direct digital marketing needs with solutions that leverage web, mobile and Second Life technologies.
- Hard To Find has launched the world's first DJ Equipment megastore HTFR within Second Life. A virtual representation of its real world store, it contains a wide range of vinyl, DJ equipment and accessories for users of Second Life to not only look at but to also purchase. The aim is to not only bring HTFR to a wider worldwide audience, who may not be able to visit their real world store in Birmingham, UK. But to also give like minded DJs a haven to meet up and chat in.
- Harvard Law School and Harvard Extension School offered a course called "CyberOne: Law in the Court of Public Opinion" within Second Life in 2006.
- IBM met in Second Life in 2006 to discuss the effects of Massively multiplayer online games (MMOGs) on business. The initial forays into SL were driven by a group in the UK called Eightbar. A team of IBMers led by Ian Hughes (aka epredator) and algernon spackler (Andrew Reynolds) working out of IBM Hursley near Winchester. Other IBM companies joined SL, such as IBM Italia, founded by avatar Eadoin Welles.
- Imperial College London (ICL) developed a virtual hospital and a series of documentary films (machinima) that describe what healthcare of the future could look like from the patient's perspective. The design of the virtual hospital campus, Second Health, is based on the principles and recommendations outlined in the Healthcare for London: A Framework for Action. This work was initially managed by Dave Taylor at NPL who subsequently moved to ICL, where the Medical Media and Design Lab continue to undertake research to evaluate the effectiveness of this new medium for public engagement, collaboration, professional education and patient information and safety in the National Health Service.
- ING Group has established a virtual community with a presence in Second Life, called ourvirtualholland.
- Leo Burnett Worldwide has established a creative hub in Second Life for globally dispersed staff to interact within.
- Lichtenstein Creative Media has set up a 16-acre (65,000 m^{2}) virtual broadcasting facility in Second Life, from which it has delivered live radio broadcasts.
- LTS Productions established a virtual machinima production presence in Second Life in 2006, called Machinima by Silver and Goldie.
- Institute of Rural Health: Rameshsharma Ramloll, faculty at the Institute of Rural Health at Idaho State University has led the implementation of play2train*, a 32-acre (130,000 m^{2}) virtual environment for emergency preparedness training in Second Life. This project is funded by (Health Resources and Services Administration) HRSA.

=== M–R ===
- Market Truths Limited provides quantitative and qualitative market research services to both organizations in Second Life and organizations interested in Second Life. Research methods include surveys, focus groups, interviews, and observational and experimental research. Market Truths won the SL Business Plan competition run by The Electric Sheep Company and Edelman.
- Max March Industries operates a radio station called MaxMarchRadio that plays inside the virtual world, develops high-end virtual estates and high-rise residences, and operates several businesses that operate inside Second Life such as STYLEMAKERS (avatar makeovers including skin, hair, and clothing) and The GIFT, a creator of virtual gift boxes and shopping bags that can package objects purchased elsewhere inside Second Life so they can be given to other users as gifts. Another site, Max Updates, is maintained with blogs and news from Max March Industries.
- MLB.com broadcast the Home Run Derby and a Red Sox-Yankees game into SL, with the help of the Electric Sheep Company.
- MTV held a fashion show which was later broadcast on G-Hole, a show on MTV's IPTV channel Overdrive.
- National Physical Laboratory, UK (NPL) developed nanotechnology Island in Second Life in the Science and Technology dedicated SciLands region. This work was initiated by Dave Taylor, one of the founders of the SciLands, who later moved to Imperial College London. Whilst at NPL he also developed a virtual hospital for and under medical direction from Imperial College London (ICL) and a series of documentary films (machinima) that describe what healthcare of the future could look like from the patient's perspective.
- The New Media Consortium, led by CEO Dr. Laurence F. Johnson, built a virtual campus in spring 2006 that includes a library, museum, planetarium, auditorium, classrooms, and a welcome center. In fall 2006, the community affiliated with the campus had grown to nearly 1000 educators, and the NMC Campus expanded from 1 sim to 7. Plans included a machinima school and a life sciences center. The NMC has hosted several events on the virtual campus including IBM's Global Innovation jam, a Howard Rheingold keynote speech, and a Second Life artists event
- Omnitel, the leading mobile communications company in Lithuania, has created a Lithuania-shaped island. The island offers oak-planting game, documentary "Flight over Lithuania", other activities and events. On March 19, 2008 the first Lithuanian concert in Second Life was organized – Lithuanian rock musician Andrius Mamontovas presented his new album to the Second Life community. The island has become the meeting place for Lithuanians participating in Second Life.
- PA Consulting Group have established a presence in Second Life. The firm uses Second Life to host virtual conferences and recruitment events, and as a tool for its clients to simulate new product and service offerings.
- Reperes market research institute launches Reperes Second Life, a virtual platform of watch and research thanks to the creation of a community: a panel of avatars which may be called upon to address issues faced by brands seeking to establish themselves or develop their offer on Second Life.
- Reuters has a news bureau which reports news in the virtual universe.

=== S–Z ===
- Simpson Millar LLP is a real-life UK-based national firm of solicitors.
- Sky News has a virtual newsroom, where visitors can visit the newsroom and see how Sky News is made, reporters and presenters also can be seen from time to time. Also all visitors can take home a TV to watch Sky News.
- SL-hosting is a Dutch company that helps other RL companies present themselves in Second Life.
- Slacker Astronomy planetarium in the Carmine region displays audio and video shows about astronomical topics and hosts chats with professional astronomers.
- SL Police is a law enforcement type group that has a partnership with Linden Labs to protect the MMORPG from trolls and griefers.
- Social Media is a consulting company founded by Gunnar Langemark (Second Life: Gunnar Langset) and is physically located in Denmark. Social Media is in Second Life to do research and to consult with clients who want to know about virtual realities like Second Life. Gunnar Langemark has 20 years experience with next-generation computer media. Social media can be found in Second Life by doing a search for "Social Media".
- Starlife Srl is a consulting company which provides a full service of development in the virtual world. The company also opened its own bases on Starlife Island in Second Life where it has organized and promoted events such as Festa del Cinema, Forum PA award and the Rome fiction festival. Starlife has realized Enel Park island for Enel SpA.
- Marketing firm Electric Artists is premiering Aloft Hotels in Second Life via a virtual construction of a hotel before the actual hotels are built. The building process was documented on virtualaloft.com.
- Telecom Italia launched four islands in Second Life in July 2007, offering a football stadium, Formula 1 circuit, drive-in movie theater, beach party area and various offices. Telecom Italia also developed the "First Life Communicator", a device allowing avatars to call and send SMS to other avatars and Italian telephone numbers (in limited beta period).
- Telus Mobility (Telus) opened a Second Life retail outlet offering replica mobile phones with Second Life specific features.
- Toyota (via Millions of Us) have offered a virtual replica of the Scion xB
- Union Island is a shared international community for trade unions with its own island sim as a base for events. The project was initiated in 2008 by Trades Union Congress, Union Network International and the New Unionism Network, with support from organisations including ver.di, UNISON and RSU IBM Vimercate.
- Universal Motown Records Group created a presence within Second Life. The Universal SoundScape Music venue was created by InWorld Studios to promote the rock band Hinder and the hip-hop artist Chamillionaire.
- The University of Southern California's Center on Public Diplomacy owns its own Second Life island. The island is used by the Center's Public Diplomacy and Virtual Worlds Project to host events and displays on the role of MMOGs, in public diplomacy.
- Wells Fargo has created a game called Stagecoach Island within Second Life, in which young players earn virtual money by answering financial questions, thereby teaching them the basics of managing their money. Shortly after opening Wells Fargo closed down the site and re-opened Stagecoach Island in Active Worlds.
- The World Transhumanist Association has used Second Life to recruit and organise a transhumanist following within the virtual world and established a large island and conference centre called "Uvvy Island" to disseminate transhumanist ideas and provide unrestricted access to useful materials (including, among other things, videos and webcasts from WTA) to interested but geographically unrelated parties. Uvvy Island is organised like a regional chapter, and even holds Chapter status within the WTA, holding weekly meetings, talks, and debates on various subjects.
- YearlyKos Convention 2007 – this Net Roots-based political organization simulcast their annual convention (at Chicago's McCormick Place Convention Center) into Second Life. The event included 4 days of LIVE streaming video from the convention including the Democratic Presidential Candidates Round Table forum debate and was a groundbreaking event in Netroots political activism.
