= PhpList =

Mailing list software

phpList
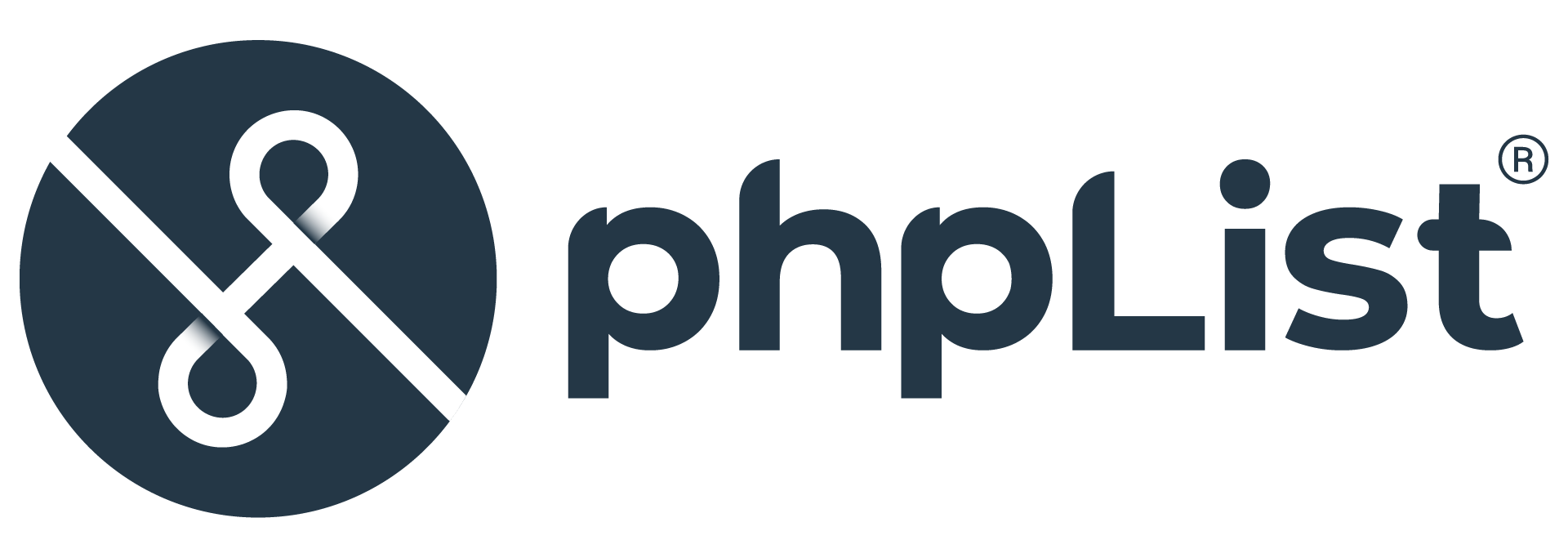

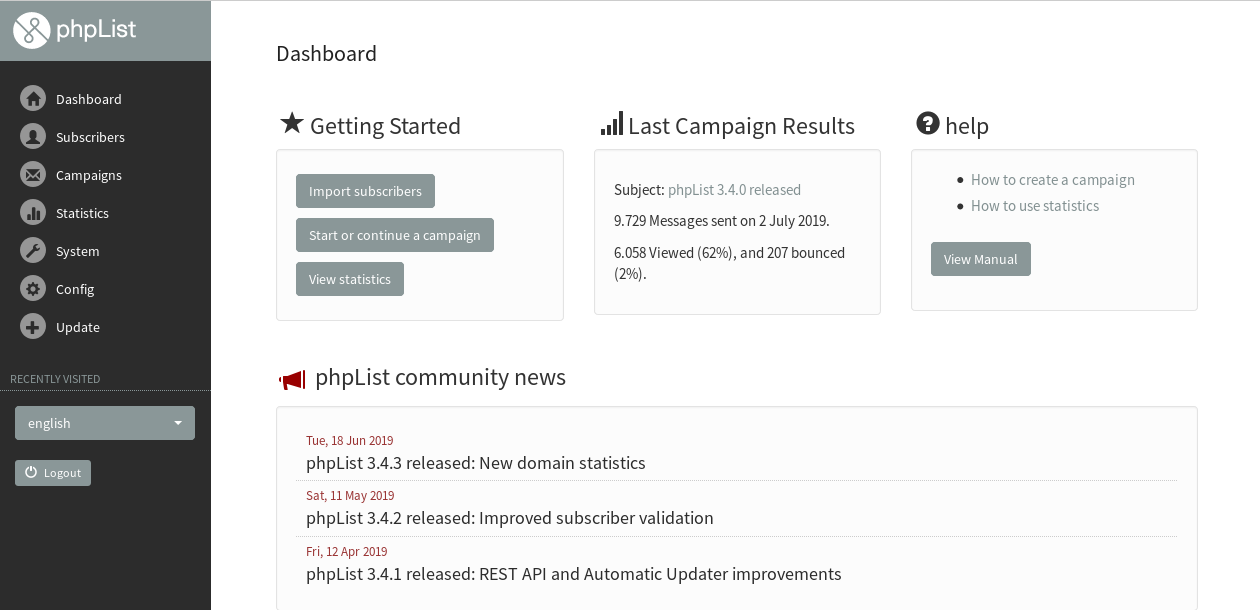
- The phpList admin dashboard
- Original author: Michiel Dethmers
- Developer: phpList Ltd.
- Release: March 2000; 26 years ago
- Stable release: 3.6.16 / May 26, 2025; 13 months ago[±]
- Preview release: 3.7.0-RC4 / June 22, 2026; 24 days ago
- Written in: PHP
- Operating system: Linux
- Available in: 35 languages
- Type: Mailing list management software
- License: GNU Affero General Public License
- Website: www.phplist.org
- Repository: github.com/phpList/phplist3

phpList is open-source software for managing mailing lists. It is designed for the dissemination of information, such as newsletters, news, advertising to list of subscribers. It is written in PHP and uses a MySQL database to store the information. phpList is free and open-source software subject to the terms of the GNU Affero General Public License (AGPL).

== Overview ==
phpList can manage a list of subscribers and send e-mail messages to large numbers of subscribers. The subscription management, registration, personal data changes and unsubscribe requests are automated. Subscriptions to one or more lists are made through a subscription page that can be integrated into a website. The information requested during registration, for example country of residence, language, date of birth, favorite food, etc. is determined by the list administrators and can be modified at any time. This information can then be used for targeted messaging, i.e., sending may be limited to subscribers who meet certain criteria, such as country or city of residence. The public interface is available in 35 languages. The documentation detailing the functions and features of the software is available in English and is partially translated into Spanish, French, and Dutch.

This software is comparable to GNU Mailman or Sympa, which also manage large-scale mailing lists, but there are two major differences: (1) phpList is only for direct mail, not for discussion, (2) people who subscribe to a list receive messages from the list, they can not reply to the list. Unlike discussion lists, phpList allows one to send messages to some of the subscribers in a list, based on complex criteria determined by the administrator. This software is useful for anyone who wants to manage a database that is more than just a collection of emails. phpList allows targeted sending with the use of sometimes very complex criteria. It is a useful tool to make information campaigns for large companies, associations, or small projects with a wide audience.

== Operating systems supported ==
The software was developed for Linux, Apache and MySQL, but is also compatible with OpenBSD, FreeBSD, OS X, and Microsoft Windows.

== Database connectivity ==
phpList is designed to connect to a MySQL database. With its support for ADOdb it is possible to extend the connectivity to other databases such as PostgreSQL, Microsoft SQL Server, SQLite, Sybase, IBM DB2, and Oracle.

== See also ==
- List of mailing list software
- LAMP (software bundle)
