= GetResponse =

Email marketing platform

GetResponse S.A.

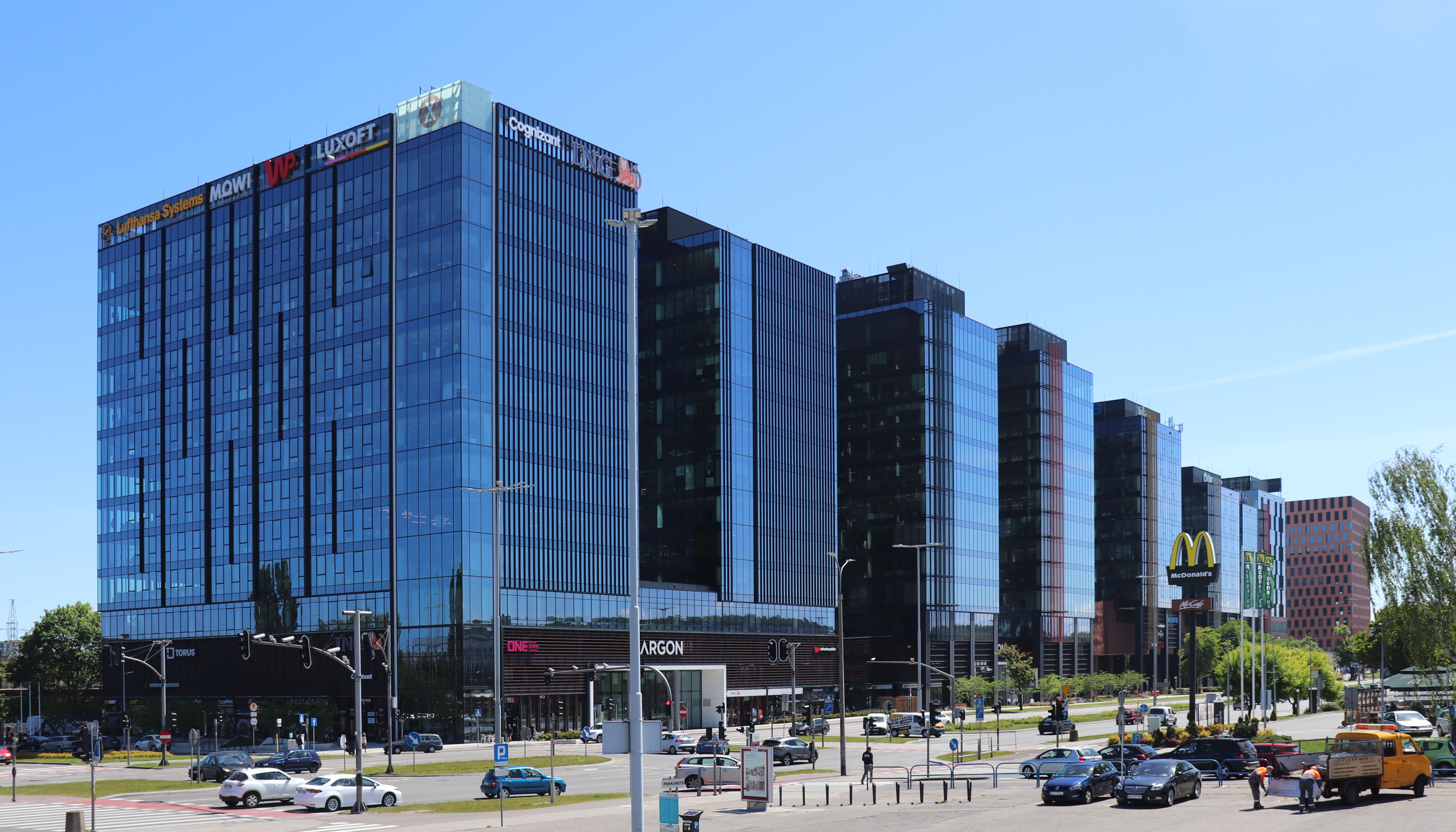
- Alchemia business center in Gdańsk district Oliwa, with GetResponse main offices
- Formerly: Bizmaker; Implix
- Type: Private
- Industry: Software as a service; Email marketing; Marketing automation
- Founded: 1998
- Founder: Szymon Grabowski
- Headquarters: Gdańsk, Poland
- Area served: Worldwide
- Key people: Szymon Grabowski (CEO); Aleksandra Grabowska; Maciej Ossowski (COO); Hanna Stopa (CFO); Michael Leslie (CTO); Mateusz Kołodziejski (CMO)
- Products: GetResponse
- Services: Email service provider; Bulk email software; Autoresponders; Website builder; Landing pages; Website monetization
- Revenue: PLN 125.23M (2025)
- Operating income: PLN −321,611 (2025)
- Net income: PLN 5,14M (2025)
- Total assets: PLN 161.76M (2025)
- Number of employees: 206 (2025)
- Website: getresponse.pl

GetResponse S.A. is a Polish technology company founded in 1998 and headquartered in Gdańsk, Poland, that develops its namesake email marketing and marketing automation platform.

The company's software supports email campaigns, website building, and webinar hosting, and since 2022, it has expanded into e-commerce personalization and content generation tools. As of 2025, GetResponse reported net revenue of PLN 134.1 million.

== History ==
=== Founding and early growth ===
In 1996, Polish entrepreneur Szymon Grabowski launched an online tourism-advertising business Travel.com.pl that listed Polish guest houses and hotels. In order to contact accommodation-listing partners at scale, Grabowski wrote his own bulk email-sending software, since no comparable tool was available on the Polish market. He launched the first version of this autoresponder in 1997. Because the venture began when Grabowski was a minor, the initial business and its domain name were registered by his business partner. After the partnership broke up, Grabowski decided to rebuild the product himself from scratch.

He launched the venture Bizmaker in 1998 in Gdynia, from the attic of his family house, with $200 in starting capital. The email-sending product was named GetResponse, while the legal entity later continued to operate as Implix. To handle early transactions still as a minor, Grabowski was unable to secure a banking partner in the United States to process customer payments, and instead used the payment processor iBill. The tool’s annual revenue grew from around PLN 200,000 in Implix's earliest years to PLN 1 million by 2000, while it was financed solely from its own earnings, relying on word of mouth. By 2004, Implix opened its first international customer-service office in Halifax.

Around 2000, Implix launched several satellite products alongside GetResponse, including an ad-tracking tool, an expiring-domain-name finder, an e-book-creation tool, and a website builder. These products were developed until the company's 2014 rebranding. In the mid-2000s, the company organized its product portfolio around its autoresponder, as well as network-marketing and search-engine marketing services. In 2005, Grabowski founded an online-payment-processing company PayLane, to serve GetResponse. PayLane later took on outside clients and in 2018 it was sold to a third party.

=== Polish-market entry ===
Since its founding, Implix targeted the U.S. market, but only in 2010, while serving 150,000 businesses across 180 countries, Implix launched a dedicated Polish-language version of its platform, which followed a reported 1,000 Polish customers. At the time, over 100,000 GetResponse accounts were sending over 8 billion emails a year. By 2012, Implix had 100 employees serving 200,000 customers worldwide. That year, the company released its mobile app and introduced a new logo built around a smiling-envelope symbol.

In 2010, Grabowski founded another company ClickConference, to develop video-conferencing and webinar service, later rebranded ClickMeeting, and from February 2016 operating as a spin-off company.

=== Automation and product development ===
Szymon Grabowski, CEO of GetResponse, at his office in 2011

In 2014, Implix, after its platform, was renamed GetResponse. The company introduced its behavioral analysis software to detect and block accounts attempting to send spam, as part of its efforts to maintain email deliverability. In 2016, the company launched its own marketing-automation engine. According to Grabowski, during betatests customers sent 4 million messages and created 12,000 automated workflows using the tool, within 1 billion customer emails per month. By late 2016, the company reported 350,000 customers worldwide, half of them in the United States, employed 300 people, and had further foreign offices including Moscow, and Kuala Lumpur.

In April 2017, GetResponse opened its first U.S. office in Boston, with a planned investment of $6 million. At the time, the U.S. market accounted for 40 percent of GetResponse’s business, and the company held an estimated 2.17 percent of the U.S. email-marketing market, ranking sixth behind market leaders Mailchimp and Constant Contact, according to data cited by PCMag.

In 2019, the company launched Autofunnel, a tool combining landing pages, email automation and paid-traffic management into a single sales-funnel builder. That year, GetResponse's revenue declined by 8.5 percent, to PLN 91 million, amid competition from larger providers, while the company added 34,000 new customers. In 2020, the company launched a website builder and a freemium plan that supported up to 500 contacts.

=== AI tools and content monetization ===
In January 2022, GetResponse converted to a joint-stock company. In December 2022, the company acquired a Polish startup Recostream that developed an AI-driven personalized product-recommendation tool for e-commerce. In 2023, GetResponse integrated its platform with Recostream's features including email drafting and marketing-campaign building tools. In 2024, the company launched a content-monetization platform for online educators and independent creators. In November 2023, the company reported serving 400,000 customers across over 180 markets.

In August 2026, GetResponse appointed Michael Leslie, previously of Dynatrace, as chief technology officer, to simplify its technology stack and increase the use of AI in engineering.

According to Grabowski from 2016, the company did not use external financing. As of the end of 2025, Grabowski owned 95% of the shares.

== Products and services ==
GetResponse

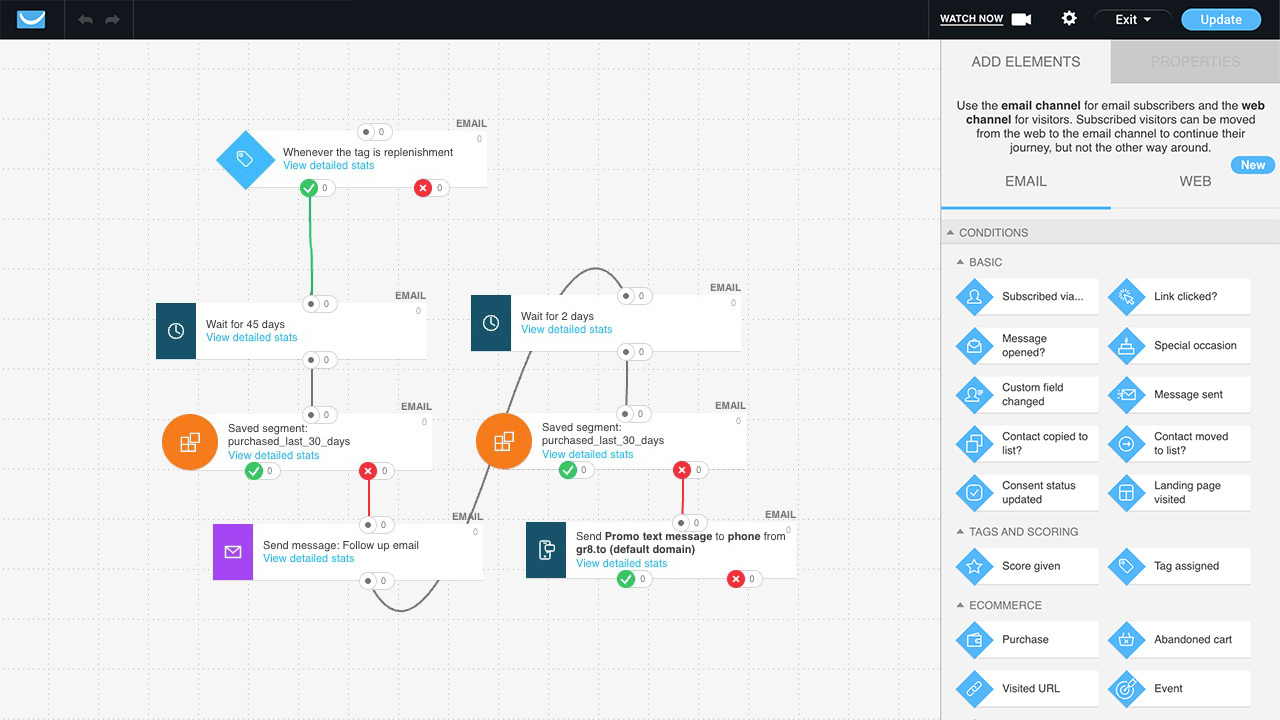
- Dashboard inside the GetResponse platform
- Developer: GetResponse S.A.
- Release: 2016; 10 years ago
- Platform: Web platform; Android; iOS
- Type: Email marketing; Marketing automation
- License: Proprietary
- Website: getresponse.pl

GetResponse develops subscription-based software for email marketing and marketing automation. Its platform includes several e-commerce personalization tools including:

- the namesake core platform for building, sending, and automating email campaigns, integrated with the company's other tools, from a free-of-charge tier that supports up to 500 contacts, to an enterprise-tier line with industry-specific packages;
- marketing automation engine that builds workflows based on subscriber behavior across the customer journey, covering the track "from lead capture to conversion,"
- landing-page manager, for building standalone pages, along with email-automation, paid-traffic, and contact forms managers,
- product recommendation tool for e-commerce customers,
- content monetization platform for online educators and independent creators, pairing a course builder, webinar hosting, and paid-newsletter subscriptions with the email and automation suite.

=== Technology and infrastructure ===
According to the company, GetResponse operates its own mail transfer agent (MTA) infrastructure and IP-reputation management systems rather than relying on third-party sending infrastructure. The company uses authentication protocols including SPF, DKIM, and DMARC, and reports email deliverability above 99 percent. The company states this infrastructure supports sending volumes of up to 100 million emails per day, and that its platform exposes application programming interfaces (APIs) for integration with third-party customer-relationship-management, content-management, and e-commerce systems.

== Corporate social responsibility ==
=== Polish Business for Ukraine ===
Following Russia's invasion of Ukraine, in March 2022, GetResponse suspended new sales and wound down marketing activity in Russia. Together with its sister company ClickMeeting, it launched the initiative Polish Business for Ukraine ("Polski Biznes dla Ukrainy"), working with the Polish–Ukrainian Zustricz Foundation and logistics partner InPost to fund and transport aid supplies. Grabowski personally contributed PLN 200,000 to launch the campaign, which other Polish companies subsequently joined. The campaign raised PLN 250,000 to fund medical supplies including refrigeration units for blood transport that directly supported a hospital in Lviv.

=== Charities ===
In April 2016, in partnership with a children's hospice (Pomorskie Hospicjum dla Dzieci) in Gdańsk, Grabowski founded a charitable foundation GetResponse Cares which supports paediatric-oncology causes. Through the foundation, PLN 475,000 were donated to cancer-related causes. In December 2016, the foundation announced funding of pediatric-oncology research of the Medical University of Gdańsk (GUMed). In February 2023, Grabowski and GUMed researchers patented a combination of plant-derived compounds intended to enhance the cytotoxic effect of chemotherapy in acute lymphoblastic leukemia treatment.

== Awards and recognition ==
GetResponse and its products have received a number of industry awards, including recognition in Inc. magazine's ranking of the fastest-growing private U.S. companies, and a listing among G2Crowd's Top 25 Enterprise Software Products (2016). In 2012, while trading as Implix, the company was named Poland's National Champion in the European Business Awards. In 2013, the company was named a finalist in Stevie Awards. In 2016, it won two bronze Stevie Awards, in a "best new product or service" category.

In 2023 and 2024, GetResponse won the MarTech Breakthrough Awards in the fields of email marketing.
