= Dada Mail =

Mailing list software

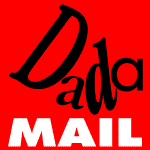
- Original author: Justin Simoni
- Release: January 2000; 26 years ago
- Stable release: 11.22.0 stable / 16 September 2023; 3 years ago
- Written in: Perl
- Operating system: Linux, Unix-like
- Available in: English
- Type: Mailing list management (MLM) software
- License: GNU General Public License
- Website: www.dadamailproject.com
- Repository: github.com/justingit/dada-mail

Dada Mail is a web-based electronic mailing list management system that can be used for announcement lists. It can also be used to create and manage discussion lists by the use of an included plug-in called Dada Bridge, which requires a cron task.

Dada Mail is written in Perl.

== Features ==
Dada Mail handles Closed-Loop Opt-in subscriptions and Closed-Loop Opt-out unsubscriptions, sending complex announce-only and/or discussion mailing list messages, archiving/viewing/searching/resending/syndicating (rss, atom) sent messages.

Unlike more traditional electronic mailing list software, like Majordomo, there is no email interface to send commands to Dada Mail. Rather, almost all administration of the mailing list is done using a web-based control panel. Closed-Loop Opt-in subscriptions are done by sending a confirmation email message, but the actual mechanism is simply a unique confirmation URL.

== History ==
Dada Mail was initially written in December 1999 and released as version 1.0 in January 2000, between Justin's first and second semester at the University of Colorado at Boulder. Its original name was Mojo Mail, a name that came to Justin after having a dream about making a successor to the Majordomo program, after struggling with that program's email-based interface for a non-profit client.

The name of this specific program was changed on December 1, 2003, after Justin Simoni received a letter from a lawyer representing Mediaplex Inc. that the name was in violation of their trademark. The name was changed to, Dada Mail. Dada is a direct reference to the early 20th century cultural movement. Justin considers Dada Mail a conceptual work of art.

== See also ==
- List of mailing list software
- Electronic mailing list
