= Sympa =

Sympa may refer to:

- Sympa (company), a Finnish software company
- Sympa HRIS, a human resources information system offered by the above company
- Sympa (software), a mailing list management (MLM) software
