= Email digest =

Email that combines exchanged emails in a mailing list

An email digest is an email that is automatically generated by an electronic mailing list and which combines all exchanged emails during a time period (e.g. day, week, month, etc.) or when a volume limit is reached (e.g. every 10 or 100 messages) into one single message.

Email digests are currently available as an opt-in feature in electronic mailing list systems such as GNU Mailman or LISTSERV. It is called an abridged summary in Google Groups. Other systems than mailing lists implement such a feature. YouTube compiles all the communications to users within a time period into a single email.

Technically, the MIME Multipart subtype Multipart/digest as defined in RFC 2046, Section 5.1.5, is a simple way to separate messages and send collections of messages within one single message.

== See also ==
- LISTSERV email list management software
- Electronic mailing list
- GNU Mailman
- Google Groups
