= DeutschlandRadio Tower =

Skyscraper in Cologne, Germany

- DeutschlandRadio-Turm (German)
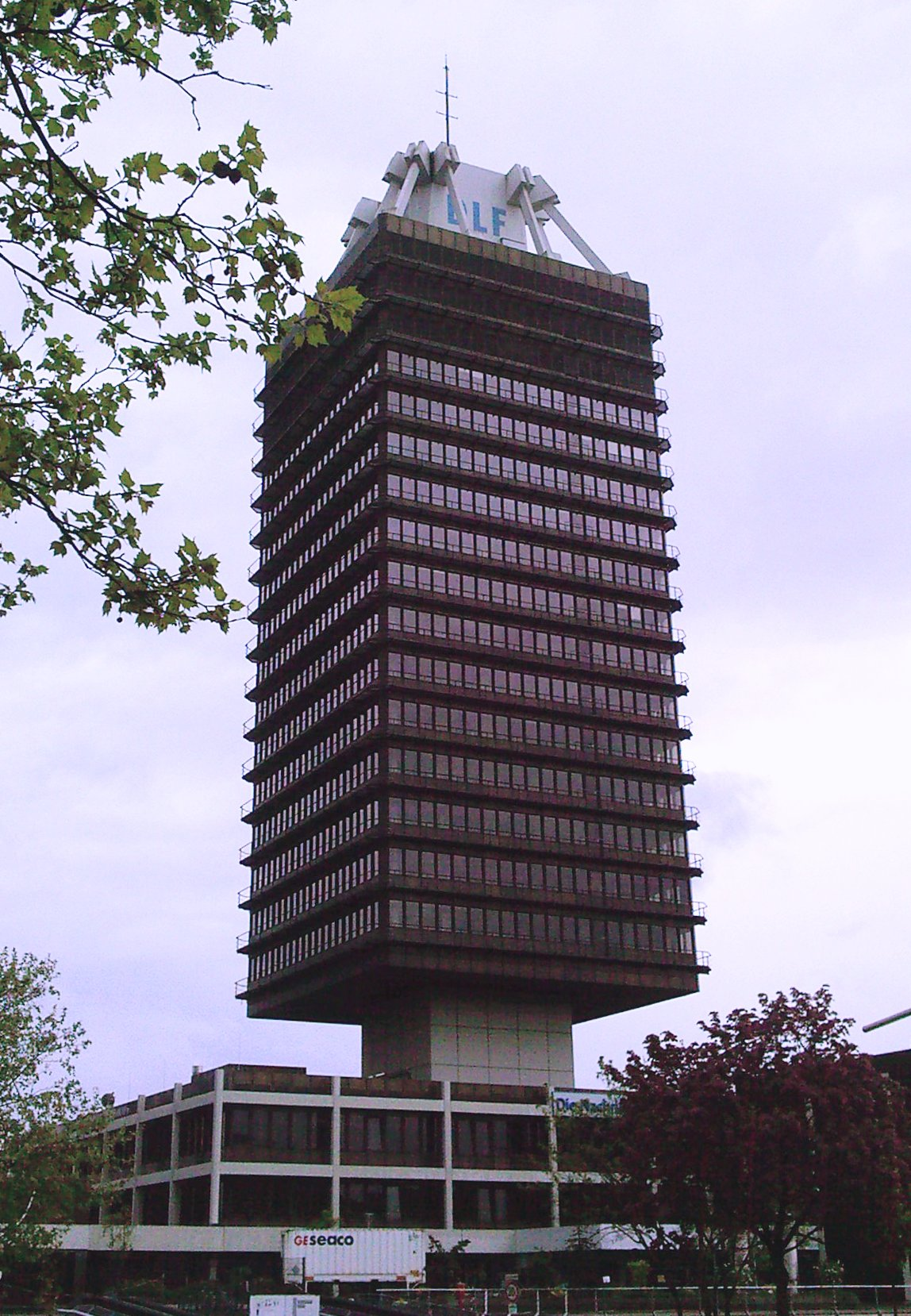
- Interactive map of the DeutschlandRadio Tower area

General information
- Status: Completed
- Type: Office
- Location: Cologne, Germany, 40 Raderberggürtel, Köln, Germany
- Coordinates: 50.90332°N 6.95977°E
- Construction started: 1971
- Completed: 1973
- Owner: Deutschlandfunk

Height
- Roof: 102 m (335 ft)

Technical details
- Structural system: Reinforced concrete
- Floor count: 19

Design and construction
- Architect: Gerhard Weber
- Developer: Federal Office for Building and Regional Planning

The DeutschlandRadio Tower (German: DeutschlandRadio-Turm) also known as the DLF Funkhaus Köln is a high-rise office building in the Raderthal district of Cologne, Germany. Built between 1974 and 1975, the tower stands at 102 m (335 ft) tall with 19 floors and is the current 9th tallest building in Cologne.

== History ==
=== Architecture ===
In 1969, the administrative board of Deutschlandfunk decided to build Gerhard Weber's preliminary design. Weber used a suspended structure borrowed from bridge construction for the tower of the building. When construction began in 1974, a cantilever structure was mounted on a 100-metre-high reinforced concrete core, from which the individual floors were lowered floor by floor. The steel cables from which the individual floors hang are inserted into the concrete beams that run diagonally across the roof of the building. The interior was state-of-the-art with studios, editing rooms and broadcasting technology. With their excellent acoustics, the broadcasting hall and chamber music hall were in line with the highly acclaimed theaters built by Weber, such as the Mannheim National Theatre and the Hamburg State Opera.

The building is located in the Raderthal district of Cologne on the left bank of the Rhine and has housed the studios and editorial offices of Deutschlandfunk since February 18, 1979 (official opening: April 24, 1980). In the immediate vicinity of the tower used to be the radio building on the Raderberggürtel of Deutsche Welle; it was completely dismantled by 2021.

Since January 29, 2024, the Deutschlandfunk high-rise has been a listed building. A renovation strategy for the tower which will cost €300,000,000 has been created in June 2024.

== See also ==
- List of tallest buildings in Cologne
- List of tallest buildings in Germany
