= GroupServer =

- Developer: OnlineGroups.net
- Initial release: 2005; 21 years ago
- Final release: 16.04 / March 1, 2016; 9 years ago
- Written in: Mostly Python, some C
- Operating system: Linux, Unix-like
- Available in: English
- Type: Mailing list management (MLM) software
- License: Zope Public License v2.1
- Website: github.com/groupserver

GroupServer is a computer software application from OnlineGroups.net for managing electronic mailing lists.

GroupServer is a Web-based mailing list manager designed for large sites. It provides email interaction like a traditional mailing list manager but also supports reading, searching, and posting of messages and files via the Web. Users have forum-style profiles, and can manage their email addresses and other settings using the same Web interface. It supports features such as Atom feeds, a basic CMS, statistics, multiple verified addresses per user, and bounce detection, and is able to be heavily customized.

GroupServer is coded primarily in Zope and Python and currently maintained by OnlineGroups.net. GroupServer is free software, distributed under the GNU General Public License.

== History ==
GroupServer was first released in 2005. It was developed by OnlineGroups.net. Initial open source release support came via E-Democracy.org with funding from the UK Local e-Democracy National Project.

== Features ==
GroupServer is free software for managing electronic mail discussion lists with an optimized web interface. It runs on Linux and most Unix-like systems, and requires Python 2.1.3 or newer. GroupServer works with Unix style mail servers such as Postfix.

Features include:

- Read and post messages via the web.
- Administer membership and post in one web interface.
- Share uploaded files.
- Search messages and files.
- Multiple email addresses on a profile.
- Multiple groups on a site
- Skinnable and customisable.

== See also ==
- List of mailing list software
- Google Groups
- Yahoo! Groups
- Electronic mailing list
- Mailing list
