= Automated whitelist =

Email addresses automatically accepted

An automated whitelist is a whitelist which was created and/or is maintained by a system that analyzes bi-directional email.

== Use by anti-spam systems ==
An automated whitelist is a whitelist which is created or maintained by a system that monitors incoming and/or outgoing email, and based on preset criteria, will add or remove entries from the whitelist without a need for human intervention.

Optionally, some automated whitelisting systems can review records of past email communications which were previously stored within an email server's (or email client's) archives for inclusion in the whitelist.

This functionality is an enhancement to creating a whitelist manually, such as exporting customer, vendor, friends, or other contact lists from various sources, to then tediously assemble them into a whitelist. Additionally, the use of such a system removes the difficult task of maintaining a whitelist as new email relationships are formed.

== How it works ==
P. Oscar Boykin and Vwani Roychowdhury of the Department of Electrical Engineering, University of California point out, "We exploit the properties of social networks to construct an automated anti-spam tool which processes an individual user's personal email network to simultaneously identify the user's core trusted networks of friends, as well as subnetworks generated by spams"; and their extensive research discovers a "surprisingly effective technique" with superior levels of "accuracy and automation"; they go on to explain, "it requires no user intervention or supervised training; second, it results in no false negatives i.e., spam being misclassified as non-spam, or vice versa."

== Criticisms ==
Some anti-spam systems which use this method have been known to oversimplify a whitelist by adding only the domain name portion of the email addresses, thereby allowing undesirable mail from spammers to slip through.

Other systems have been known to inappropriately add spammers due to clients using autoresponders, such as an "I'm Out of the Office Today" message, or spammers using a read receipt.

Most systems are known to require all outgoing email to be funneled through their system for analysis and automated inclusion; whereas, others offer a small plugin for the existing email server, thereby not altering the existing outbound delivery path.

== See also ==
- Whitelist
