= List of tallest buildings in Cologne =

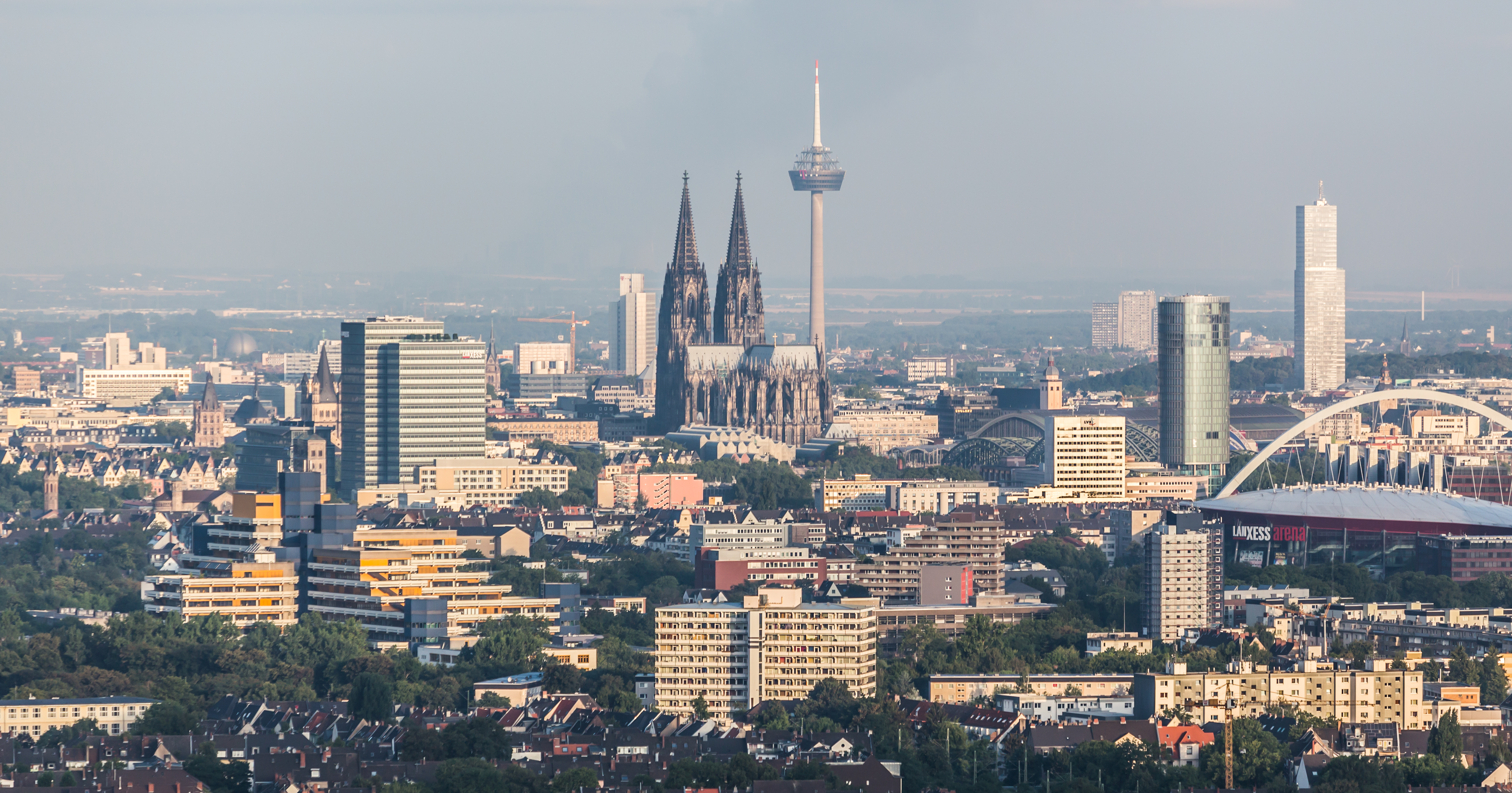
Skyline of Cologne

This list of tallest buildings in Cologne ranks high-rise buildings and free standing structures that reach a height of 50 meters (164 feet) without superstructures. When it was completed in 1925, the Hansahochhaus was the tallest skyscraper in Europe for a short time. Currently, the tallest skyscraper in Cologne is the Kölnturm. The tallest structure in Cologne is the Colonius telecommunications tower at 266 m (873 ft), followed by Cologne Cathedral at 157.38 m (516 ft).

The criterion for skyscrapers is usually a height of 150 meters or more. So far, none of Cologne's high-rise buildings have reached this mark; the tallest skyscraper in North Rhine-Westphalia is the 162.5 m (533 ft) tall Post Tower in neighboring Bonn.

Rank	Name	Image	Height m (ft)	Number of floors	Year completed	Use or note
	Colonius		266 m (873 ft)		1981	Telecommunications tower, tallest structure in Cologne
	Cologne Cathedral		157.38 m (516 ft)		1880	Tallest twin-spired church in the world
1	Kölnturm		148.5 m (487 ft)	43	2001	Tallest skyscraper in Cologne, with antenna spire 165.48 m (543 ft) tall
2	Colonia-Haus		147 m (482 ft)	45	1973	Tallest building in Germany from 1973 to 1976 and Germany's tallest residential tower until 2020
3	Uni Center Köln		133 m (436 ft)	42	1973	
	Pollonius		115 m (377 ft)		1990	
4	TÜV-Rheinland-Turm		112 m (367 ft)	22	1974	
5	Ringturm Cologne		109 m (358 ft)	26	1973	Heptagonal building, offices & residential
6	Cologne Justice Center		105 m (344 ft)	25	1981	
7	Kölntriangle		103 m (338 ft)	29	2006	KölnTriangle is headquarters of the European Aviation Safety Agency (EASA).
8	Herkules Hochhaus		102 m (335 ft)	31	1969	Residential
9	Funkhaus Köln (DLF-Funkhaus)		102 m (335 ft)	19	1975	Radio studios, offices
10	Deutsche Telekom AG		99 m (325 ft)	19	1970s	Offices
11	Rheinsternhaus		96 m (315 ft)	27	1973	Residential
12	Lanxess Tower		95 m (312 ft)	19	1969	2013 refurbishment of the existing Lufthansa-Hochhaus
13	An der Fuhr 4		93 m (305 ft)	26	1969	Residential
14	Universitätsklinikum Köln		89 m (292 ft)	23	1971	Building of the University Hospital
	Herz-Jesu-Kirche		83.41 m (274 ft)		1900	Catholic church
15	DKV-Administration building		82 m (269 ft)	18	1966	Administration building of DKV and ERGO Insurance
16	Messeturm Köln		80 m (262 ft)		1928	Part of the Cologne exhibition halls
	Basilica of St. Severin		79 m (259 ft)		11–13th century	Romanesque basilica church
	Severinsbrücke		77.2 m (253 ft)		1959	
17	Wohnheim an der Sporthochschule		77 m (253 ft)	27	1973	Residential
	Lanxess Arena		76 m (249 ft)		1998	Height of the arch
18	Bonner Straße 211		76 m (249 ft)	26	1971	Residential
19	Türnicher Straße 1–5		75 m (246 ft)	21		Residential
19	Wohnheim an der FH		75 m (246 ft)	21	1979	Residential
	Great St. Martin Church		75 m (246 ft)		1250	Romanesque Catholic church
21	West-Center		74 m (243 ft)	25	1973	
22	Krohstraße 4 (Allianz Wohnpark)		73 m (240 ft)	25	1973	Residential
23	Konrad-Adenauer-Straße 72–82		71.6 m (235 ft)	20	1973	Residential
24	Kierberger Straße 15		70 m (230 ft)	23	1965	Residential
24	An der Schanz 1		70 m (230 ft)	23	1976	Residential
26	In der Kreuzau 2–4		68 m (223 ft)	23	1973	Residential
26	Görlinger-Zentrum 3		68 m (223 ft)	19		Residential
26	Belfortstraße 9		68 m (223 ft)	19		Residential
26	Mainstraße 38		68 m (223 ft)	19		Residential
30	Wohnturm Opal		67 m (220 ft)	20	2018	Residential
	Basilica of the Holy Apostles		67 m (220 ft)		12th century	Romanesque Catholic church
31	Hansahochhaus		65 m (213 ft)	17	1925	First "skyscraper" in Cologne
31	ABC-Tower		65 m (213 ft)	17	2003	Offices
33	Alte Brühler Straße 8		64 m (210 ft)	18	1974	Residential
33	An der Fuhr 3		64 m (210 ft)	18	1974	Residential
33	Wiener Weg 4		64 m (210 ft)	18	1971	Residential
33	Premier Inn Hotel		64 m (210 ft)	18		Hotel
37	Kranhaus Süd		62 m (203 ft)	17	2010	Offices
37	Kranhaus 1		62 m (203 ft)	17	2008	Offices
37	Kranhaus Nord		62 m (203 ft)	17	2009	Residential
	Cologne City Hall		61 m (200 ft)		1414	
	St. Agnes		61 m (200 ft)		1901	Neogothic Catholic church
40	Krohstraße 2		61 m (200 ft)	21	1973	Residential
40	Riehler Straße 200		61 m (200 ft)	19	1976	Residential
40	Messeplatz 1		61 m (200 ft)	15	1977	Offices
43	Millennium (Zurich Gruppe Deutschland)		60 m (197 ft)	15	2019	Offices, part of MesseCity Köln
43	Centraal (KPMG)		60 m (197 ft)	15	2024	Offices, part of MesseCity Köln
	Cologne Rodenkirchen Bridge		59.4 m (195 ft)		1954	
45	Ringkarree		58 m (190 ft)	17	2001	
46	Arbeitsamt		57 m (187 ft)	16		
46	Raderthalgürtel 5–11		57 m (187 ft)	15		
46	Buschweg 23		57 m (187 ft)	15		
46	Im Falkenhorst 2–10		57 m (187 ft)	15		
46	Konrad-Adenauer-Ufer 79–81		57 m (187 ft)	15		
46	Wohnheim der FH 2		57 m (187 ft)	15		
52	Wohnhochhaus Wiener Platz 2		57 m (187 ft)	19	1960	
53	Gerling-Hochhaus		56 m (184 ft)	15	1953	
54	Deutsche Telekom		55 m (180 ft)	18	1965	
54	DKV-Neubau		55 m (180 ft)	14	2005	
	St. Marien church		52 m (171 ft)		1866	Romanesque church
	Mühlheim Bridge		50.50 m (166 ft)		1951	
	St. Andrew's Church		50 m (164 ft)		12th century	
56	Best Western Premier Regent Hotel		50 m (164 ft)	14	2005	

== Under construction ==
Name	Height (m)	Height (ft)	Floors	Year
Centraal (KPMG)	60	197	15	2024
Düxx	60	197	16	2025
LUX121	57	187	15	2024
SechtM (Parkstadt Süd)	50 (?)	164	15	2026
Scala (Mülheim)	45	148	12	2024

== Proposed ==
Name	Height (m)	Height (ft)	Floors	Year
Colonius Nord	96	315	26	2030
Deutzer Hafen	80 + 65 + 60 + 60 + 50 + 45	263 + 213 + 197 + 197 + 164 + 148		2031
LVR-Tower	69.5	228	18	2027
Mühlenturm (Lindgens Areal)	65	213	20	2027
Thyssen-Area (Ehrenfeld)	65	213	17	2030
Weltstadthaus-Erweiterung	50	164		2028
Primo (Ehrenveedel)	45 (?)	148	12	2027

== Demolished ==
Name	Image	Height m (ft)	Floors	Opened	Demolished
Funkhaus am Raderberggürtel		138 m (453 ft)	34	1980	2019–2021
Studio Deutsche Welle		86 m (282 ft)	24	1976	2019–2021
LVR-Haus (former Ford-administration)		54 m (177 ft)	16	1966	2021–2022

== See also ==
- List of tallest buildings in Germany
- List of tallest structures in Germany
