= Squeeze page =

Web page

A squeeze page is a landing page created to solicit opt-in email addresses from prospective subscribers.

== Background ==
In the field of direct marketing, the subscriber list is considered the most important part of a mailing campaign. Marketers devote a great deal of time and money to collecting a "list" of highly targeted subscribers as a result. Common methods for gathering a mail list include business reply mail, telemarketing, list rentals, and co-registration agreements.

Email lists serve the same purpose in the digital world. A highly targeted list of email subscribers allows the owner to market their product and service with a fairly high probability of success. With the proliferation of spam, however, consumers are very careful about giving out their email addresses. To ease consumer concerns experienced online, businesses create "Squeeze Pages" that detail the businesses' privacy standards and what the subscriber will receive.

== Squeeze page strategies ==
A squeeze page is a single web page with the sole purpose of capturing information for follow-up marketing; that means NO exit hyperlinks. Quality squeeze pages use success stories that the prospect would relate to when making a buying decision. They also use things like color psychology, catchy sales copy and keyword rich text placed with SEO (search engine optimization) in mind. Some advanced marketers even use audio and video on their squeeze page.

Internet marketers borrow copywriting techniques from offline direct response marketing. This includes the use of a headline, bullets, teaser copy, deadlines, testimonials, scarcity, and the like. Aggressive marketers will present visitors with multiple incentives in exchange for their contact information.

As a general rule, Internet marketers try to keep the content on their squeeze pages to a minimum. The goal of the page is to obtain the visitor's email address; additional information could distract the user or cause them to "click away" to a different website. Navigation and hyperlinks are almost always absent from typical squeeze pages. The absence of links is used to focus visitors' attention on one choice: register for the email list or leave the site.

Squeeze pages are often used in conjunction with an email autoresponder to begin delivering information as soon as the visitor confirms their email address. The autoresponder may be utilized to send a series of follow-up emails or to provide an immediate download link to get information. Promising information upon completion of confirming their email address has proven to be an effective method of increasing opt-ins using squeeze pages.

New technology has also led to adding voice or video to squeeze pages in an effort to capture the visitor's attention.

== Search engine optimization ==
In 2011, on two occasions (Google "Panda" and "Farmer" in February and June), the major search engines adjusted their algorithms to more accurately rank and sometimes exclude squeeze pages that are considered to be "spam" due to their lack of content. In addition, some marketers have seen their pay-per-click campaigns being penalized by restrictions that prevent "affiliates" from purchasing pay-per-click advertising to build opt-in lists for future sales. In response, marketers have begun to increase the amount of content included on Squeeze pages to ensure that their page maintains its search result rankings.

Content on a squeeze page can be increased by adding a blog at the bottom of the page. Another squeeze page design that is growing in popularity is a combination of a linear sales page and a squeeze page. This design keeps the squeeze page basics such as opt-in form, bullet points, and video at the top of the page. At the bottom of the page the user would find more content and product information.

== See also ==
- Autoresponder
- Electronic mailing list
- Landing page
