= Majordomo (software) =

Electronic mailing list software

- Original author: Brent Chapman
- Release: June 1992; 34 years ago
- Final release: 1.94.5 / 19 January 2000; 26 years ago
- Written in: Perl
- Operating system: Unix
- Type: Mailing lists
- License: Freeware
- Website: Majordomo website at the Wayback Machine (archived 2020-07-06)

Majordomo 2
- Developer: Jason Tibbitts
- Final release: 0.1201103110 / March 11, 2011; 15 years ago
- Website: www.mj2.org
- Repository: github.com/jasontibbitts/majordomo

Majordomo is a mailing list manager (MLM) developed by Brent Chapman. It is written in Perl and works in conjunction with sendmail on UNIX and related operating systems. The name is derived from Latin "majordomo" meaning "master of the house"; in English, the word refers to a large household's chief servant.

The current version of Majordomo is 1.94.5, released 19 January 2000.

The official Web site warns that it will not work with Perl versions 5.001 and 5.005_01 specifically. It recommends using Perl 4.036 or the latest version available. Support for Perl 4.036 may not be kept for the future.

== History ==
With the advent of email, many mailing lists were maintained manually, with a list owner adding and removing participants by editing a text file. In 1984, LISTSERV was developed to run on IBM VM mainframes, and automated mailing lists on a large scale.

Most mailing lists moved to commercial mailing list hosting services, often with a stipend of $100 or more paid to the list owner by the hosting service in exchange for the transfer. Most of those hosting providers were subsequently bought out by Yahoo! and merged into its now-discontinued Yahoo! Groups service.

Majordomo has been in widespread use since 1992, predating the popularity of the Web browser, in an era when many people had access to email, but the World Wide Web did not enjoy wide deployment. As a result, tasks such as subscribing and unsubscribing are only handled by sending mail messages.

There are front-ends, such as MajorCool, to provide a Web interface. Many mailing lists still use Majordomo.

=== Majordomo 2 ===
It is a complete rewrite of Majordomo with a focus on keeping the familiar email interface, while greatly improving the Web interface and other features. This coding effort is referred to as Majordomo 2 and is being used by the OpenBSD project.. Since Feb 19, 2016 the project has been stalled.

== Licensing ==
Majordomo is community-supported source available software; the license states "No part of Majordomo may be incorporated into any program or other product that is sold, or for which any revenue is received without written permission of Great Circle Associates". There are a few exceptions listed in the license to this: "You may install Majordomo at your site and run mailing lists for other (sic) using it, and charge for that service. You may install Majordomo at other sites, and charge for your time to install, configure, customize, and manage it. You may charge for enhancements you've made to the Majordomo software, subject to the distribution restrictions listed [in the license]. You may not charge for the Majordomo software itself".

== See also ==
- List of mailing list software
