= Uni Center (Köln) =

Skyscraper in Cologne, Germany

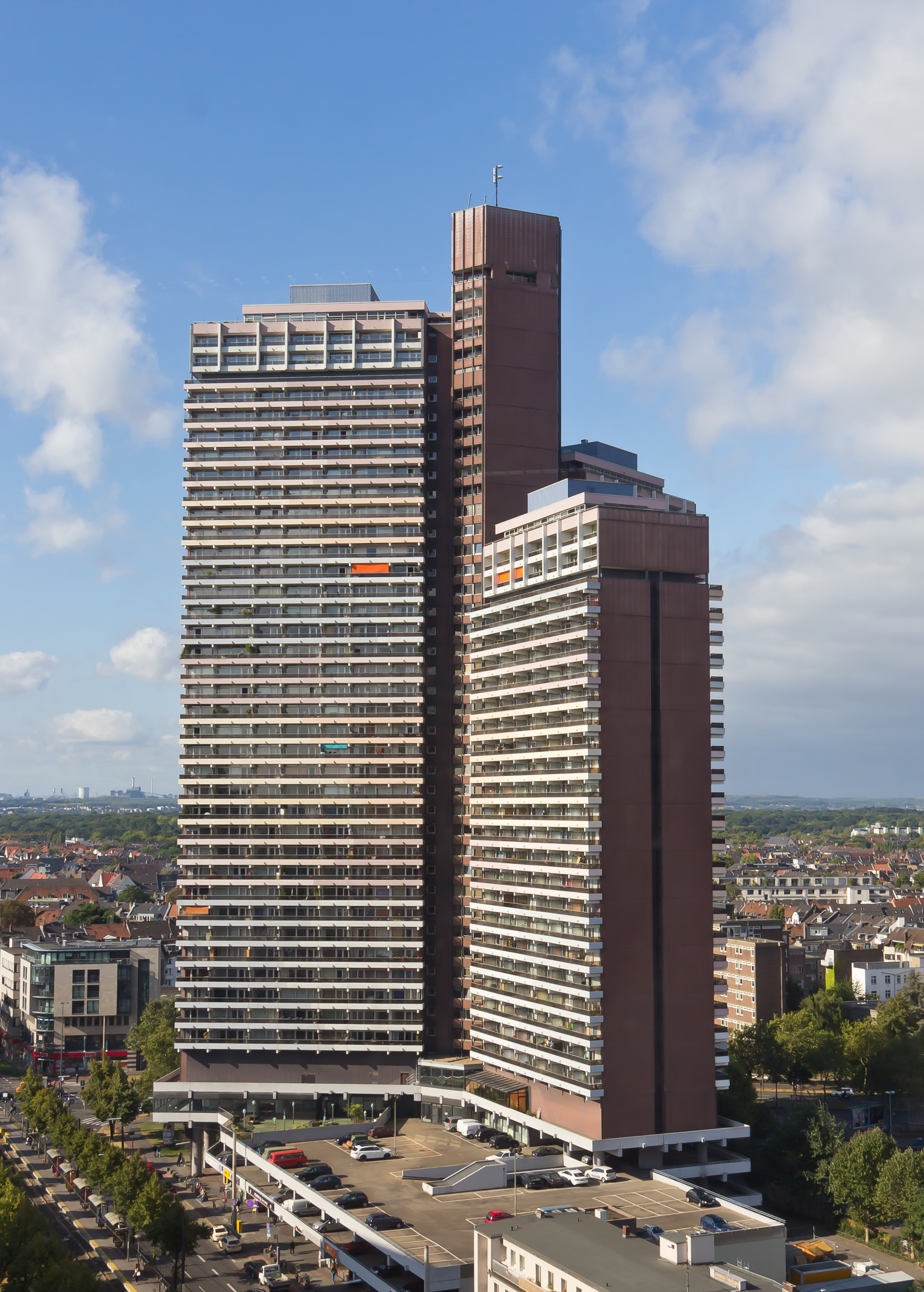
- Interactive map of the Uni Center area

General information
- Status: Completed
- Type: Residential
- Location: Cologne, Germany, 124 Luxemburger Str., Köln, Germany
- Coordinates: 50.92176°N 6.93279°E
- Construction started: 1971
- Completed: 1973
- Cost: DM 90,000,000
- Owner: Cologne Student Union

Height
- Roof: 134 m (440 ft)

Technical details
- Structural system: Concrete
- Floor count: 45
- Floor area: 265,000 m^{2} (2,850,000 sq ft)

Design and construction
- Architect: Werner Ingendaay
- Developer: Foncia Immonova

Website
- Uni Center

The Uni Center is a high-rise residential building in the Sülz district of Cologne, Germany. Built between 1971 and 1973, the tower stands at 134 m (440 ft) with 45 floors and is the current third tallest building in Cologne.

== History ==
The chief architect of the project was the Cologne native professor Werner Ingendaay (1923–2008), and the developer was the property developer Deba Wohnbau CCAA GmbH, Cologne. After construction began in January 1971, the foundation stone was laid in February 1971 by the then Federal Minister of Transport, Lauritz Lauritzen, who described the planned building as a "bold experiment". The topping-out ceremony for the Y-shaped high-rise took place in October 1972, and it was ready for occupancy on August 1, 1973.

=== Architecture ===
The residential building is divided into three wings consisting of three cojoined volumetries with different heights: "U" (38+3 floors), "N" (31+3 floors), and "I" (26+3 floors), which are connected by the building core "C" (45 floors). For better orientation, the wings are uniformly colored: "U" in orange, "N" in green, and "I" in yellow. From the 5th floor upwards, there are apartments on both sides of a wing and in the core section "C". The main part of the building ends in the wings with technical and storage rooms (U38, N31, I26), followed by two floors with maisonette apartments and a penthouse on the top floor. The lower floors contain several shops, restaurants, and the parking garage.

With a total of 968 rentable units, the Uni Center is one of the largest residential buildings in Europe. Around 60% of all units were sold as condominiums, the rest in the "I" block were taken over by the Cologne Student Union. It operates 378 apartments between 14 and 24 m^{2} as a dormitory for students. The highest part of the building is the central tower "C" at 134 meters. There are 45 upper floors, three lower floors and the ground floor. In total, around 1200 people live in the building complex, who can travel in nine elevators. The Uni-Center ranks third on the list of high-rise buildings in Cologne.

=== Trivia ===
The tower was one of the filming locations for the movie The Lost Honor of Katharina Blum, which premiered in October 1975 and is based on the novel of the same name by Heinrich Böll.

During the German Autumn, Red Army Faction terrorists rented an apartment in the university center to prepare the kidnapping of Hanns Martin Schleyer. In October 1977, the GSG 9 searched several apartments and was able to determine that Adelheid Schulz had rented a secret apartment under the name Markward until the end of September 1977. During the search, the Lufthansa plane Landshut was hijacked.

== See also ==
- List of tallest buildings in Cologne
- List of tallest buildings in Germany
