= LISTSERV =

Electronic mailing list software

Listserv
- Original author: Éric Thomas
- Initial release: 1986; 40 years ago
- Stable release: LISTSERV 17.5 / November 20, 2024; 15 months ago
- Platform: Cross-platform
- Type: Mailing lists
- License: Proprietary
- Website: www.lsoft.com/products/listserv.asp

The term Listserv (styled by the registered trademark licensee, L-Soft International, Inc., as LISTSERV) has been used to refer to electronic mailing list software applications in general, but is more properly applied to a few early instances of such software, which allows a sender to send one email to a list, which then transparently sends it on to the addresses of the subscribers to the list.

The original Listserv software, the Bitnic Listserv (also known as BITNIC LISTSERV) (1984–1986), allowed mailing lists to be implemented on IBM VM mainframes and was developed by Ira Fuchs, Daniel Oberst, and Ricky Hernandez in 1984. This mailing list service was known as Listserv@Bitnic (also known as LISTSERV@BITNIC) and quickly became a key service on the BITNET network. It provided functionality similar to a UNIX Sendmail alias and, as with Sendmail, subscriptions were managed manually.

In 1986, Éric Thomas developed an independent application, originally named "Revised Listserv" (also known as "Revised LISTSERV"), which was the first automated mailing list management application. Prior to Revised Listserv, email lists were managed manually. To join or leave a list, people would write to a list administrator and ask to be added or removed, a process that became more time-consuming as discussion lists grew in popularity.

By 1987, the users of the Bitnic Listserv had migrated to Thomas' version.

Listserv was freeware from 1986 through 1993 and is now a commercial product developed by L-Soft, a company founded by Thomas in 1994. A free version limited to ten lists of up to 500 subscribers each can be downloaded from the company's Web site.

Several other list-management tools were subsequently developed, such as Lyris ListManager in 1997 (now Aurea Email Marketing), Sympa in 1997, GNU Mailman in 1998, and Gaggle in 2015.

== Automated mailing list management ==
In 1986, Éric Thomas redeveloped the original concept of an automated mailing list manager. Whilst a student at École Centrale Paris, he modified the software originally now known as LISTSERV. Some of the early software features allowed joining or leaving a list without the need for human administration. The list owner could also add or remove subscribers, and edit templates for both welcome and system messages. Amongst other innovations LISTSERV introduced double opt-in in 1993 and the first spam filter in 1995.

After the release of Thomas' LISTSERV in 1986, LISTSERV@BITNIC was enhanced to provide automatic list management, but this enhancement was abandoned a few months later when Bitnic installed Thomas' LISTSERV.

Other than their name, Bitnic's and Thomas' products are unrelated and neither product is based on the other product's code.

Though electronic mailing lists (also known as "email lists") are not as popular as they once were, they survive due to their ease of use.

== Trademark ==
LISTSERV was registered as a trademark with the U.S. Patent and Trademark Office in 1995, based on its use since 1986. It was registered with the Swedish Patent and Registration Office, PRV, in 2001. As such, in those jurisdictions, using the word "listserv" to describe a different product or as a generic term for any email-based mailing list of that kind is a trademark misuse. The standard generic terms are electronic mailing list, e-list, or email list for the list itself, and email list manager or email list software for the software product that manages the list. Nevertheless, the generic use of the term has been common at times.

== Security ==
Individual user passwords were stored in plaintext until version 15.0. This made them available to users who are listed as "Site Managers" or "Postmasters" in the application configuration. Storing passwords in plaintext has the potential to allow anyone with access to the site, including attackers who might have compromised the site, to read the credentials. With the 2007 release of version 15.5, passwords are now stored hashed to defend against this attack.

== Editions ==
LISTSERV is available in several licensing options: LISTSERV Lite Free Edition for non-commercial hobby use; LISTSERV Lite for smaller workloads; LISTSERV, the standard, full-featured version; LISTSERV HPO (High Performance Option); and LISTSERV Maestro (for customized and targeted email publishing and reporting).

== Supported operating systems ==
A list of currently-supported operating systems can be found at LISTSERV Supported Operating Systems

== See also ==
- List of mailing list software
- Massively distributed collaboration
