= List of mailing list software =

This is a list of notable electronic mailing list software, which facilitate the widespread distribution of email to many Internet users.

Name	Initial release	Latest stable release	Latest release date	Written in	License
Dada Mail	2000-01	11.22.0 stable	16 September 2023	Perl	GNU GPL
Discourse	2013	v2026.1.0	8 January 2026	Ruby	GNU GPLv2 +
ezmlm/idx	1997-06-15	7.2.2	2014-05-15	C	GNU GPLv2
ezmlmx	2025-09-11	0.69	2025-09-11	C	GNU GPLv2
GNU Mailman	1999-07-30	3.3.10	1 October 2024	Python, some C	GNU GPLv2 +
GroupServer	2005	16.04	2016-03-01	Python, some C	GNU GPL
LISTSERV	1986	17.5	2024-11-20	?	Proprietary
ListProc	1988	8.2.10	2002-03-11	C	NPL
Majordomo	1992-06	1.94.5	2000-01-19	Perl	Majordomo
mlmmj	2004-04	2.2.3	2026-10-30	C	MIT
phpList	2000-03	3.6.17	August 9, 2026; 3 months ago[±]	PHP	AGPL
SmartList	1993	3.15	2000-09-03	C	GNU GPL
Sympa	1997-04-01	6.2.78	2026-03-28; 7 months ago[±]	Perl, some C	GNU GPL
No longer in active development

== Publications ==
- Managing Mailing Lists: Majordomo, LISTSERV, Listproc, and SmartList. O'Reilly Media. 1998. ISBN 156592259X.
