= INASP =

International Network for Advancing Science and Policy
- Abbreviation: INASP
- Formation: 1992; 34 years ago
- Type: INGO
- Region served: Worldwide
- Official language: English
- Parent organization: International Council for Science (ICSU)
- Website: INASP Official website

INASP (International Network for Advancing Science and Policy) is an international development charity working with a global network of partners in Africa, Latin America and Asia.

Based in Oxford, UK and governed by an international Board of Trustees, INASP is run with a small number of full-time staff working with, and through, partners and networks in over one hundred countries. INASP's work is funded by its partner countries, governmental and non-governmental development agencies, and philanthropic foundations.

== History ==
INASP original name, now superseded, was "International Network for the Availability of Scientific Publications". It was established by the International Council for Science (ICSU) in cooperation with UNESCO, TWAS and AAAS in 1992. The organization's original goal was to improve worldwide access to science information.

It was registered as a charity in 2004.

== Work ==
INASP deliver impact in three ways:

1. They work with educators and researchers to create rigorous knowledge and to drive powerful learning for youth
2. They assist universities to create the knowledge pipeline for the future – one that is built on local talent, deep expertise, and that’s attuned to the needs of their countries and communities.
3. They are a catalyst for impact in Southern knowledge systems. They use their expertise and experience so that Global South educators and researchers – and the institutions they lead and serve – can thrive.

== Projects ==
=== Transforming Employability for Social Change in East Africa (TESCEA) ===
Transforming Employability for Social Change in East Africa (TESCEA) project is helping young people to use their skills and ideas to tackle social and economic problems. TESCEA supports universities, industries, communities and government to work together to create an improved learning experience for students – both women and men.

The first phase of TESCEA was funded by the UK’s Foreign, Commonwealth & Development Office as part of the SPHEIR (Strategic Partnerships for Higher Education Innovation and Reform) programme to support higher education transformation in focus countries in Sub-Saharan Africa, Asia and the Middle East. SPHEIR was a competitive grant scheme designed to catalyse innovative ‘partnerships’ in low-income countries to improve the performance, governance and influence of higher education systems and institutions. SPHEIR partnerships sought to transform the quality, relevance, access and affordability of higher education to achieve sustainable change in higher education systems.

In the second phase phase, INASP plan to integrate TVET institutions; leverage new expertise and financing for youth business creation; pilot use of new digital technologies, including AI, both as tools for instruction and to focus on critical new skills for learners.

=== Rising Scholars ===
The Rising Scholars project (formerly known as AuthorAID) has two key goals: to increase the success rate of Global South researchers in achieving publication; and to increase the visibility and influence of research in the developing world. Rising Scholars achieves these objectives through networking, resources, training and mentoring.

== See also ==
- Open Access Scholarly Publishers Association, of which INASP is a member
- Information Management Resource Kit (IMARK)
- Dgroups
