= Ringturm Cologne =

Skyscraper in Cologne, Germany

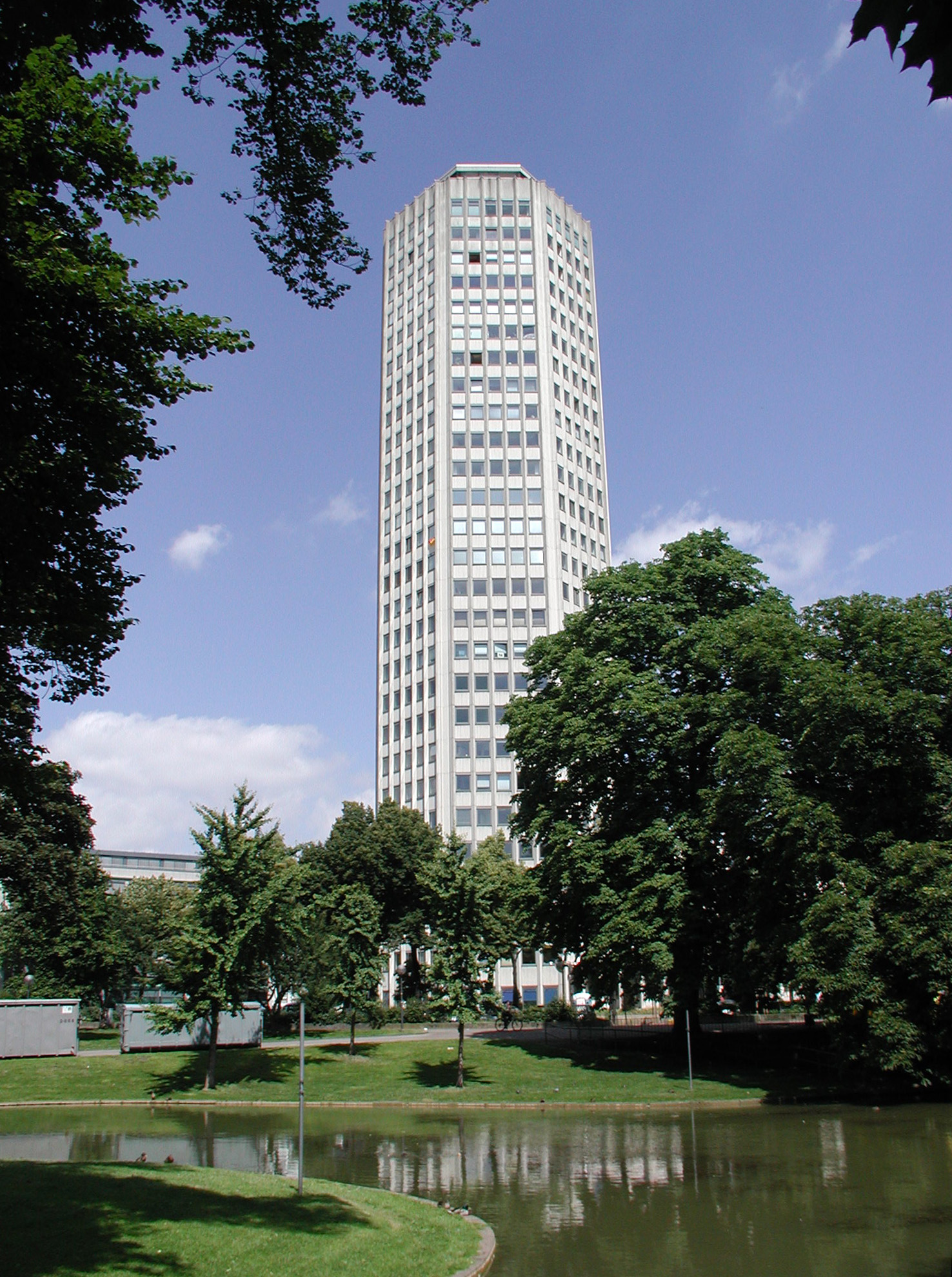
- Interactive map of the Ringturm Cologne area

General information
- Status: Completed
- Type: Office
- Location: Cologne, Germany, 1 Theodor-Heuss-Ring, Köln, Germany
- Coordinates: 50.95136°N 6.95989°E
- Construction started: 1971
- Completed: 1973
- Owner: Gerling Group (former)

Height
- Roof: 109.1 m (358 ft)

Technical details
- Structural system: Concrete
- Floor count: 26

The Ringturm Cologne is a high-rise office building in the Neustadt Nord district of Cologne, Germany. Built between 1971 and 1973, the tower stands at 109.1 m (358 ft) with 26 floors and is the current fifth tallest building in Cologne.

== History ==
=== Architecture ===
The Ringturm was completed in 1973 on behalf of the Cologne-based insurance group Gerling-Konzern, who wanted a representative and highly visible landmark. The skyscraper is located on Ebertplatz on the Cologne Ring, after which the tower was named. The building is located in Cologne's city center, its address is Theodor-Heuss-Ring 1.

The tower, built of reinforced concrete and 109.1 meters high, is clad with a concrete curtain wall suspended in front of it. The building has a characteristic geometric structure that is based on a heptagon. It has 26 floors and 6507 m^{2} of residential and office space. The first ten floors are offices. The high-rise includes an integrated parking garage with an area of 2380 m^{2}.

The Gerling Group used the building itself until 2011. In March 2011, Gerling sold the building to a project developer who marketed it as condominiums. After the Gerling brand was dismantled, these rooms became unnecessary and the structure was eventually sold to a developer who transformed the primary areas into condominiums and marketed them. The adjacent parking garage received six new apartments, which are accessible from the Ringturm. Since its conversion to residential space, the converted Ringturm consists of 89 apartments, some of which are used commercially. It is the sixth-highest skyscraper in Cologne.

== See also ==
- List of tallest buildings in Cologne
- List of tallest buildings in Germany
