= Dgroups =

- Formation: Online since 2002 - Dgroups Foundation established in 2009
- Type: Non Profit Foundation
- Location: Utrecht, The Netherlands
- Chairman: Dr. Neil Pakenham-Walsh
- Website: www.dgroups.org

Dgroups is a partnership of international development organisations working together towards a common vision: A world where every person is able to contribute to dialogue and decision-making for international development and social justice. The platform is administered by the Partner Members of the Dgroups Foundation (below).

== Brief history ==
Dgroups - Development through dialogue - was set up in 2002 as an online platform offering tools and services that bring individuals and organisations together in the international development community.

Dgroups started as a joint initiative of seven development organisations: Bellanet/IDRC, the Department for International Development (DFID) (DFID), the Institute for Connectivity in the Americas (ICA), the International Institute for Communication and Development (IICD), OneWorld, the Joint UN Programme on HIV/AIDS (UNAIDS) and the UN Economic Commission for Africa (UNECA). These organisations were looking for an online communication tool that would suit their needs for target groups in the developing world, as well as other development practitioners worldwide. As none of the existing knowledge sharing applications were considered suitable, they decided to join forces and build their own system starting from an existing Bellanet platform. Dgroups is online since 2003.

After having grown and matured in Bellanet/IDRC as a project, in March 2009 Dgroups members decided that an independent legal entity was needed at the heart of the partnership and the Dgroups Foundation was established in the Netherlands. The Dgroups Foundation now governs the development and running of the platform and related online services.

== Dgroups platform ==
The Dgroups platform is designed and developed keeping in mind low-bandwidth users. Thus exchanges occur mainly via email, using electronic mailing lists. The Dgroups platform offers online tools and services needed to support the activities of a team, a group, a network, a partnership or a community.

Dgroups supports more than 800 active communities of practice, with more than 270,000 registered users. It delivers around 500.000 email messages each day, half of which are exchanged with and within African countries.

== Dgroups Foundation ==
As of February 2017 the Dgroups Foundation comprises 16 Full Partners and 7 Associate Partners.

Full Partners:

- CIDSE
- CTA - Technical Centre for Agricultural and Rural Cooperation ACP-EU
- DFID - Department for International Development
- ECDPM - European Centre for Development Policy Management
- FAO - Food and Agriculture Organization of the United Nations)
- Forum for Agricultural Research in Africa (FARA)
- Hivos - Humanist Institute for Co-operation with Developing Countries
- IDS - Institute of Development Studies
- INASP - International Network for the Availability of Scientific Publications
- Rural Water Supply Network
- SDC - Swiss Agency for Development and Cooperation
- SNV - Netherlands Development Organisation
- THET - Tropical Health & Education Trust
- UNCDF - United Nations Capital Development Fund
- UNECA - United Nations Economic Commission for Africa
- UNISDR - United Nations Office for Disaster Risk Reduction

Associate Partners:

- Access Agriculture
- Alfa Redi
- cinfo
- Euforic Services
- Ricardo Wilson-Grau Consultoria em Gestão Empresarial Ltda
- Savana Signature
- The Broker Online
