= Herkules Hochhaus =

Skyscraper in Cologne, Germany

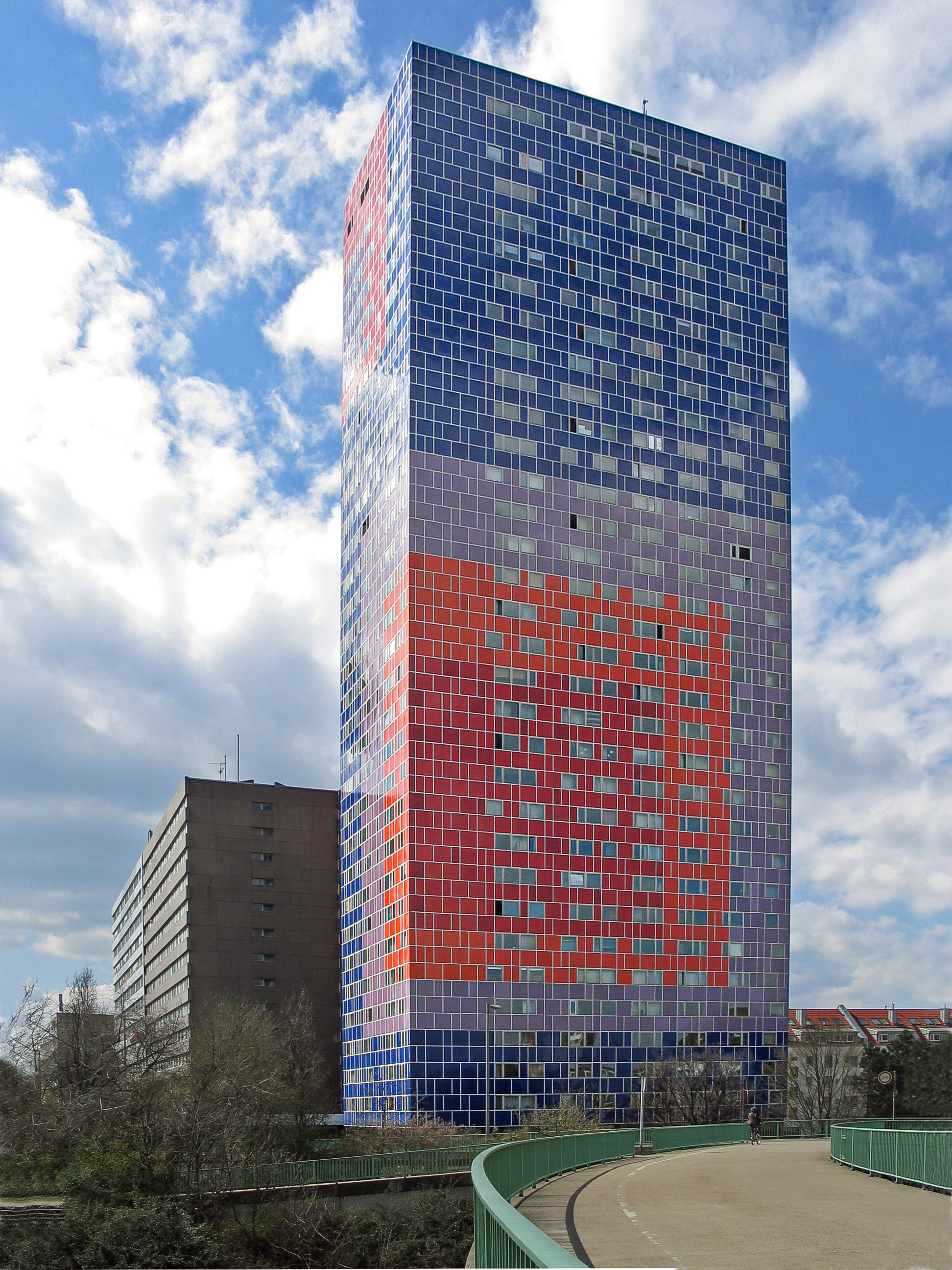
- Interactive map of the Herkules Hochhaus area

General information
- Status: Completed
- Type: Residential
- Location: Cologne, Germany, 1-5 Graeffstraße, Köln, Germany
- Coordinates: 50.95035°N 6.93375°E
- Completed: 1969
- Owner: Kallmeyer & Nagel

Height
- Roof: 102 m (335 ft)

Technical details
- Structural system: Concrete
- Floor count: 31

Design and construction
- Architect: Ernst Neufert

Website
- Herkules Hochhaus

The Herkules Hochhaus is a high-rise residential building in the Neuehrenfeld district of Cologne, Germany. Inaugurated in 1969, the tower stands at 102 m (335 ft) tall with 31 floors and is the current 8th tallest building in Cologne.

== History ==
=== Architecture ===
In the 1960s, the city of Cologne had intended to create new urban living space near the city center. Following the example of other residential densifications through vertical arrangement, i.e. high-rise buildings, the architect Peter Neufert was commissioned to build Cologne's first "super residential building" (self-promotion). Neufert had previously planned and built office high-rises. The building was built by the Dr. Rüger Group in the (controversial) developer model.

Since its renovation, the high-rise has been clad in blue, orange, red and lilac enamelled metal sheets. The silver-coloured windows, divided into three parts and installed in three different variations, follow a free rhythm, a feature of the “systemic architecture” formulated by Neufert.

He implemented this consistently in all of his high-rise buildings: the usual rigid axis arrangement of the windows with their structure in strict and fixed lines ("rasteritis") gives way to a looser, lively external façade. This also allows for a flexible, function-oriented room layout inside: the apartments are between 24 and 33 square meters in size, the two-room apartments 43 square meters. In addition, each floor also has two larger apartments with three rooms each, which without exception face the cathedral.

The building was named after the adjacent Herkulesstraße (see also: Herkulesberg); it has 31 floors with 427 residential units. There is a doorman and four elevators, two of which stop on the even floors and two on the odd floors. A trip from the ground floor to the 31st floor takes about a minute. On the top floor there is a swimming pool, a sauna and a party room.

Despite its colorful exterior (nicknamed: Parrot House), which also serves as a popular postcard motif, the skyscraper remained unpopular with the people of Cologne from the very beginning.

In the first few years, an architecture magazine was quick to comment: "The residential factory is scaring off neighbors." In 2005, the Cologne Tourist Board awarded the building the "Sour Lemon" award, a negative prize for unsightly architecture that detracts from the attractiveness of Cologne's tourism.

The residents are from a student and international background with a comparatively high fluctuation.

On January 11, 1979, a fire broke out on the first floor, which was started by a candle. A young man died while using the elevator, and another was seriously injured by jumping from a height of eight meters.

== See also ==
- List of tallest buildings in Cologne
- List of tallest buildings in Germany
