= Sympa (software) =

Mailing list management software

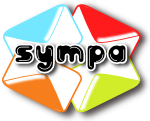

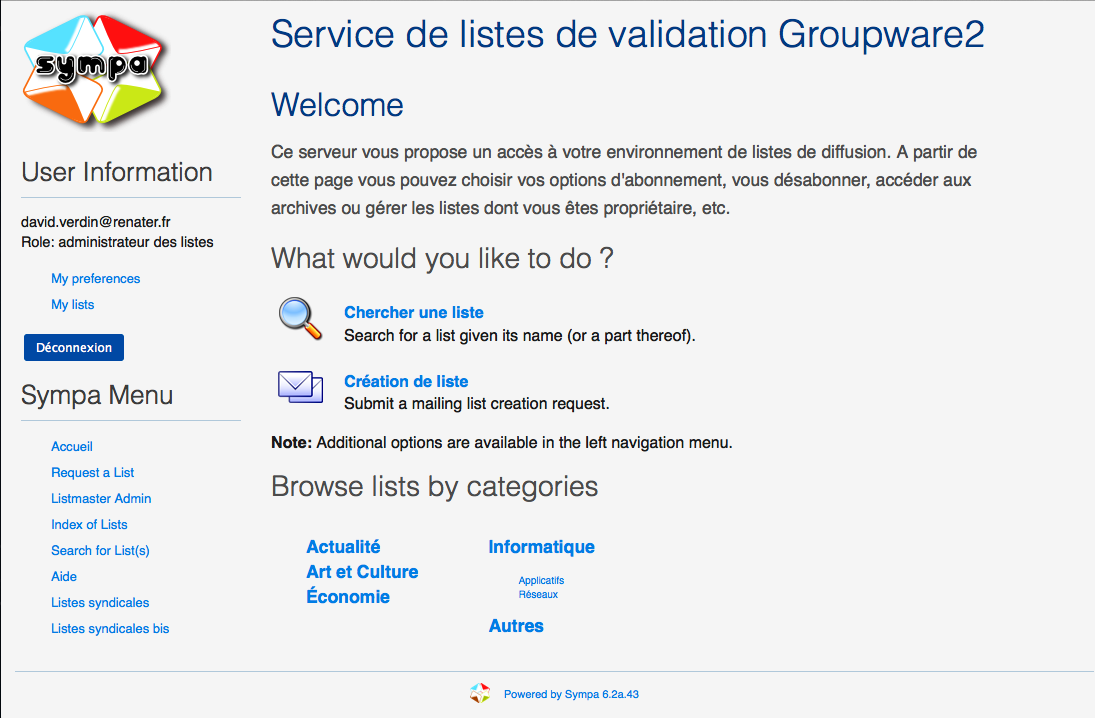
- Sympa 6.2 snapshot french
- Original authors: Christophe Wolfhugel, Serge Aumont, Olivier Salaün, David Verdin, Étienne Méléard
- Developers: Soji Ikeda, Guillaume Rousse
- Release: 1 April 1997; 29 years ago
- Stable release: 6.2.78 / 28 March 2026; 4 months ago
- Written in: Perl, C
- Operating system: Linux, Unix-like
- Available in: 20+ languages
- Type: Mailing list management (MLM) software
- License: GNU General Public License
- Website: www.sympa.community
- Repository: github.com/sympa-community

Sympa is a mailing list management (MLM) software. Its name, which is an acronym for Système de Multi-Postage Automatique (i.e. Automatic Mailing System), also means "nice" (friendly) in French.

Sympa is free and open-source software subject to the terms of the GNU General Public License (GPL).

== Features ==
Sympa's features include bulk mailing, service messages, and web pages defined by templates, subscriber information stored in a RDBMS, and an external antivirus plugin. Its web front-end offers a portal-like interface where the user can control all of their list subscriptions and administrative powers in one place (i.e. one site per user) while Mailman (prior to 3.0), for example creates one site per list.

Data is stored in a relational database such as MySQL, PostgreSQL, or Oracle; some configuration data is still held in text files, but the stated goal of the developers is to eventually hold as much configuration data as possible in the database as well.

Sympa consists of at least five concurrent daemons communicating through the database or by placing files in spools: a main daemon accepting incoming mail and controlling the other processes, a bounce daemon managing incoming bounces, an archiver archiving outgoing mail, a task manager doing scheduled maintenance, and a bulk mailer doing the actual distribution of list messages to their recipients.

The work of the main daemon can be split up into up to three parallel instances; for the bulk mailer, an arbitrary number of instances may be run in parallel. At least in theory, the bulk mailer processes can even be spread across a cluster of hosts. The architecture, combined with the use of a database table for buffering outgoing mail, makes Sympa well-suited for large and very large list environments handling millions of subscribers.

Other features are: (a full list of features is available on the Sympa web site.)

- high performance for huge lists ( > 700.000 subscribers)
- MIME-compatible
- data provisioning using LDAP, SQL or other data sources
- various authentication method (SSO, LDAP, X.509)
- benefit of S/MIME and DKIM
- internationalized
- web archive with access control, message removal, etc.
- multi-domain server designed for service providers.
- sophisticated automatic bounce management
- automatic service message and web interface customizable
- SOAP interface for integration with other applications

== History ==
Sympa development began in 1995 and it was first released in 1997. Its initial goal was to ensure continuity with the TULP list manager, produced partly by the initial author of Sympa, Christophe Wolfhugel. The first version of Sympa included authentication, flexible command management, high performance in internal data access, and object-oriented code for easy code maintenance.

Since 2011, Sympa development has been handled by RENATER. Since 2017, Sympa development has been done by The Sympa Community.

== Adoption ==
Among the customers adopting Sympa are the universities in Edinburgh and Glasgow.

== See also ==
- List of mailing list software
- Distribution list
- Electronic mailing list
