= Marketing automation in email campaigns =

Marketing automation in email campaigns refers to a numerous methods implemented in marketing for segmenting, targeting, scheduling, automating, and tracking of marketing messages. This can be for any marketing channel, but is popular among email and SMS channels.

== Overview ==
Marketing automation in email campaigns primarily involves the use of software or web-based services to execute, manage, and automate marketing tasks and processes. Automation methods are extensively used to replace manual and repetitive tasks where possible and to implement more personalized approaches for interactions.

== Features and components ==
=== Segmentation ===
Processing large marketing data requires segmentation. This means dividing the email list into smaller, more targeted groups based on various criteria such as demographics, psychographics, past purchases, and behavioral data.

=== Personalization ===
Personalization allows businesses to tailor their email content to each recipient. This could involve customizing the greeting or delivering personalized product recommendations based on previous purchases or browsing history.

=== Scheduling ===
Automated emails can be scheduled to be sent at optimal times based on data like when recipients are most likely to open and read emails. This increases the chance of engagement and interaction.

=== Analytics and Reporting ===
Most email marketing automation tools provide detailed analytics and reporting features. This enables marketers to measure the performance of their email campaigns and make data-driven decisions to improve future campaigns.

=== A/B Testing ===
A/B testing involves sending two different versions of the same email to different groups of recipients to see which version gets better results. Results can be measured in terms of high open rates or conversions.

== See also ==
- Email marketing
- Digital marketing
- Marketing automation
