= SciLands =

Area in the virtual world Second Life

- Formation: December 2006
- Purpose: Creating science and technology education content for virtual worlds.
- Headquarters: SciLands in Second Life
- Location: Second Life
- Main organ: Senate and council

SciLands is an area within the virtual world Second Life dedicated to science and technology. The member organizations share the borders of their regions to create a larger virtual continent. Their goal is to foster conversations and ideas that might not have occurred if each region were separate. Other goals of the SciLands include increasing visitor traffic and making it easier to find useful educational content within Second Life.

SciLands members have regular meetings in Second Life where they share ideas, try to help each other, vote on new memberships, and plan future projects. Members also share resources such as meeting spaces and developers.

SciLands was initially formed around the International Spaceflight Museum and NASA CoLab. Since its establishment, it grew to host a variety of other organizations including government agencies, universities, and museums, but many of these organisations have since left Second Life, so the area has become increasingly fragmented.

== Highlighted content ==
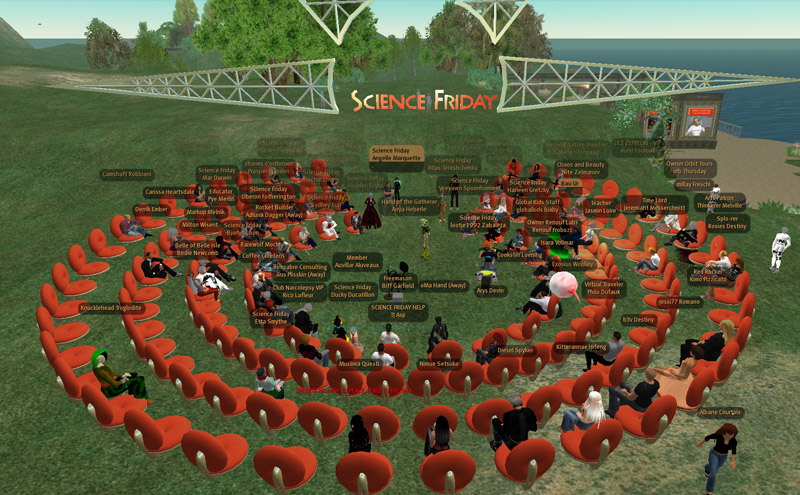
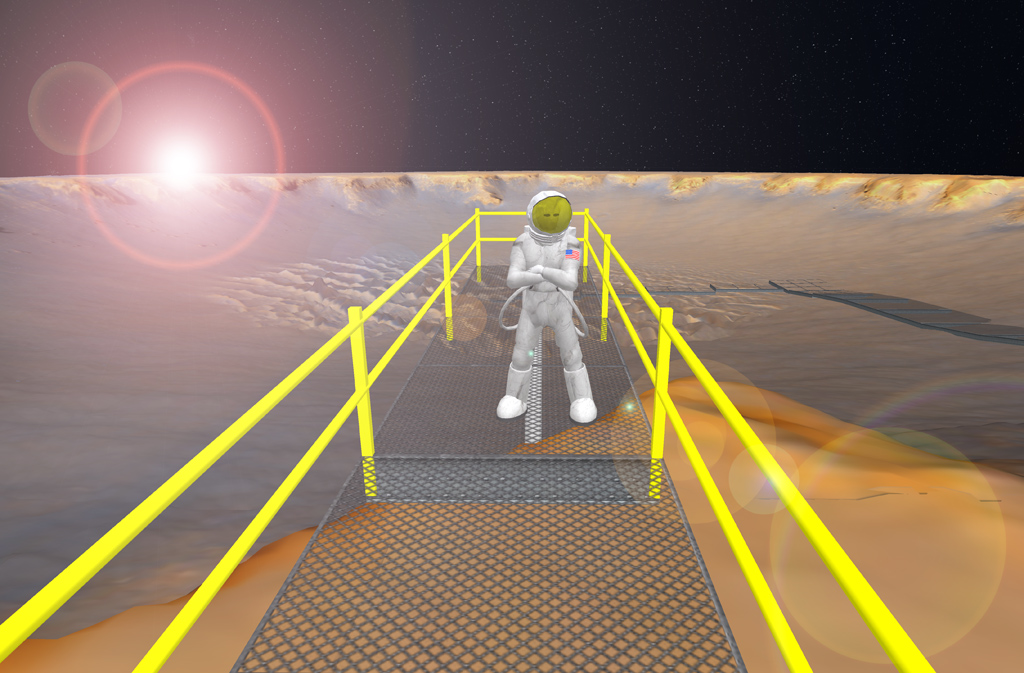
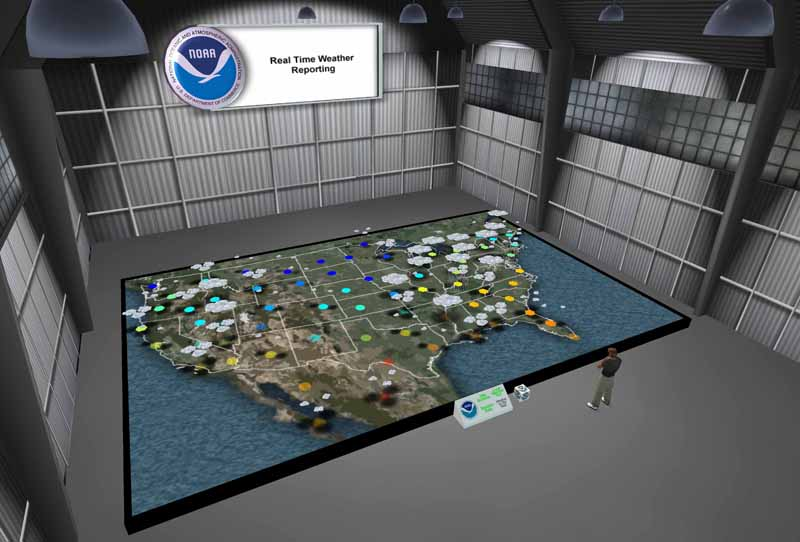
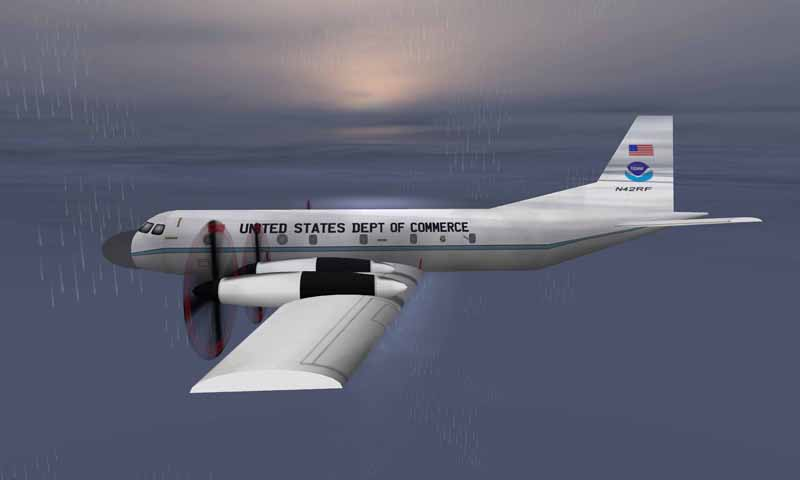
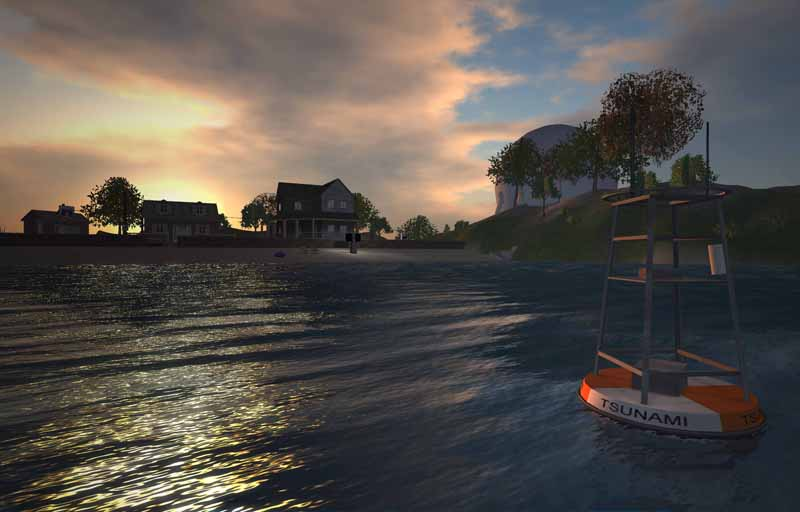
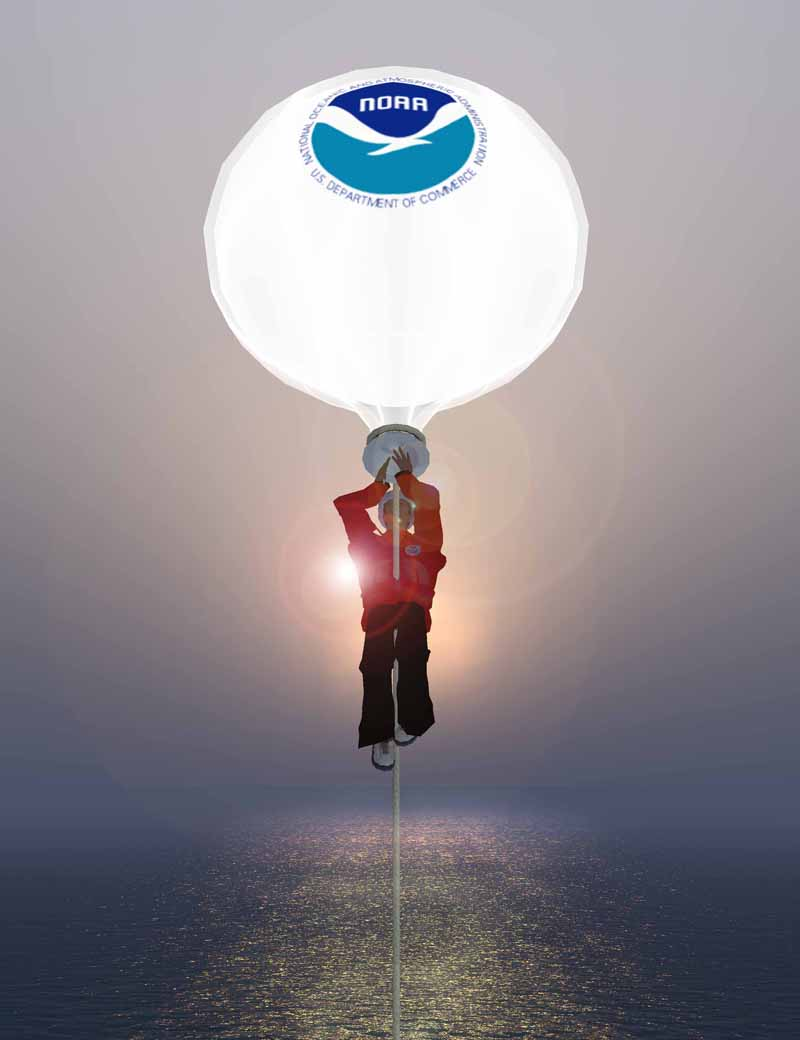
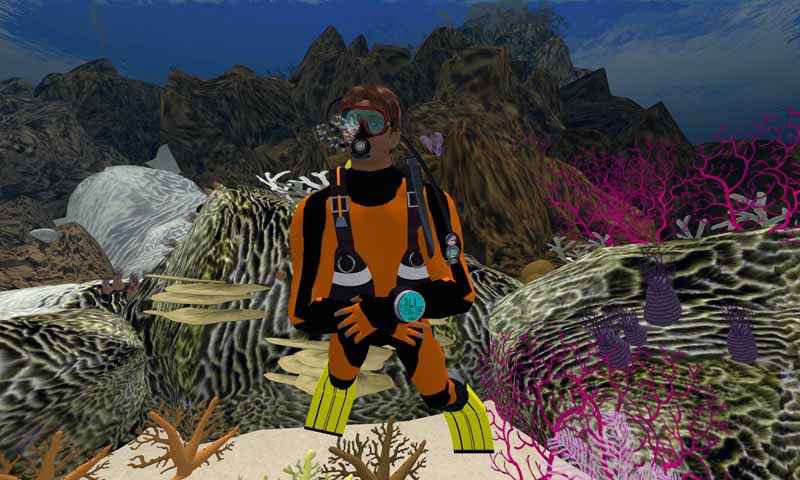
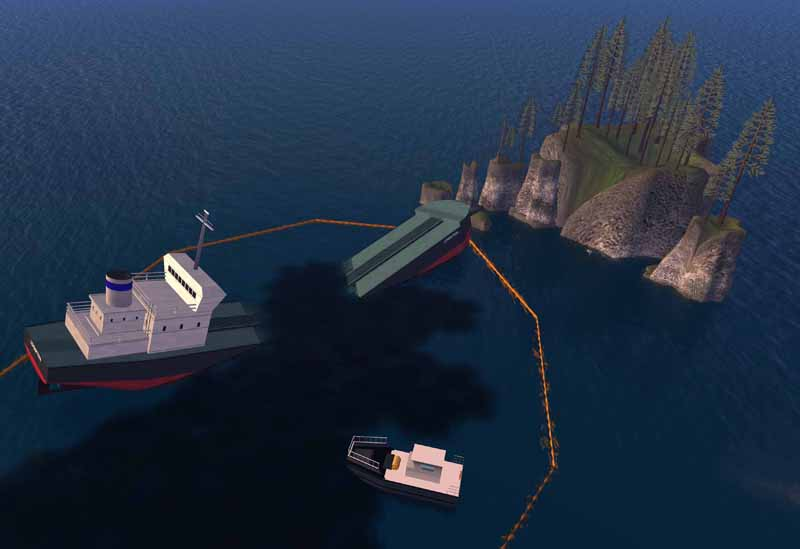
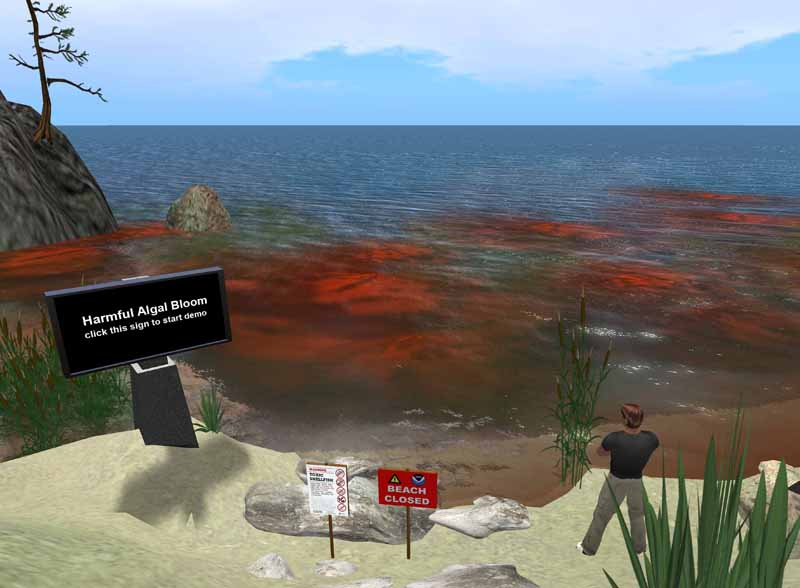
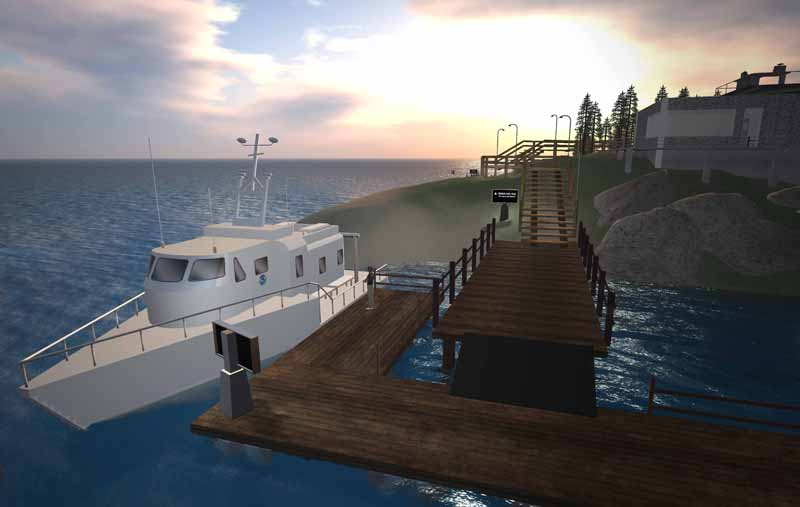
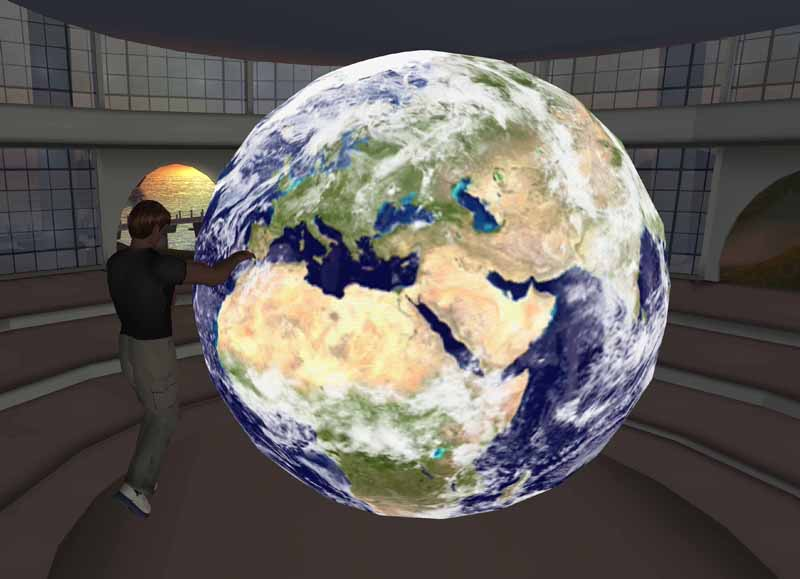
Name	Category	Sponsoring Organization	Description	Photo
NPR's Science Friday	General	NPR's Science Friday	A weekly talk show on NPR covering a variety of science-related topics.
Victoria crater	Space	NASA	A one-third scale model of Victoria crater found on the surface of Mars.
Real-time US weather map	Earth Science	NOAA	Observe the current weather above the continental U.S.
Hurricane Ride	Earth Science	NOAA	Fly through a virtual hurricane aboard a P-3 Orion Hurricane Hunter.
Tsunami Demonstration	Earth Science	NOAA	See the deadly effects of a tsunami wave and learn how they are formed.
Weather Balloon Ride	Earth Science	NOAA	Hold on to a balloon and learn about the instrumentation that NOAA uses to collect atmospheric data.
Submarine Ride	Earth Science	NOAA	Visit a variety of coral sanctuaries worldwide on board a virtual submersible.
Oil Spill Cleanup Demonstration	Earth Science	NOAA	Assist in the cleanup of an oil spill.
Red Tide Demonstration	Earth Science	NOAA	Understand the effects of harmful algae bloom commonly known as red tide.
Sea Charting Demonstration	Earth Science	NOAA	Map the sea floor aboard an NOAA ship.
Science On A Sphere	Earth Science	NOAA	Visualize Earth data sets on a spherical projection screen.

=== General ===
- Nanotechnology
- Genetics
- Science School I, II, III

=== Space ===
- Rocket Ride to Space
- Virtual Planetarium
- Solar System Tour
- Apollo 11 Landing Site on the Moon
- Real-time Satellite Positions
- Martian Dust Storms

=== Health science ===
- Visualizing Future Healthcare Options for London (Imperial College London)

== Member organizations ==
Name	Description/Focus	Logo
NOAA	The National Oceanic and Atmospheric Administration (NOAA) is a scientific agency within the United States Department of Commerce focused on the conditions of the oceans and the atmosphere.	
National Physical Laboratory (NPL UK)		National Physical Laboratory
NASA	The National Aeronautics and Space Administration is an agency of the United States government responsible for the nation's public space program.	
Exploratorium	The Exploratorium: a hands-on museum of science, art, and human perception in San Francisco.	
Elon University	A private institution in North Carolina.	Elon university logo
University of Denver	A private university in the Rocky Mountain region, DU has undergraduate, graduate, and professional programs.	
The Tech Interactive	The Tech Interactive is a hands-on technology and science museum located in San Jose, CA.	
Imperial College London	Imperial provides scholarship, education, and research in science, engineering, management, and medicine.	
US National Library of Medicine (NIH)	The National Library of Medicine (NLM), on the campus of NIH in Bethesda, Maryland, is the world's largest medical library. It collects materials in all major areas of the health sciences and to a lesser degree in chemistry, physics, botany, and zoology.	
National Space Society	The National Space Society (NSS) is an independent, educational, grassroots, non-profit organization dedicated to creating a space-faring civilization.	
Space Studies Institute	Space Studies Institute is a nonprofit educational and research organization. Founded in 1977 by Dr. Gerard K. O'Neill, Gerard O'Neill, Princeton University professor and author of The High Frontier, SSI sponsored and conducted research into areas such as solar power satellites, lunar bases, space colonies, asteroid mining, and mass drivers.	
NPR Science Friday	Weekly two-hour radio program about science, technology, and environmental issues in the news.	
Loughborough University		
Space Frontier Foundation	The Space Frontier Foundation is an organization of people dedicated to opening the Space Frontier to human settlement as rapidly as possible.	
Future Focus - BERR (UK)	Futurefocus is a purpose-built resource in London, open to everyone in the Department for Business, Enterprise & Regulatory Reform (BERR), the Department for Universities, Innovation & Skills (DIUS), the Department for Children, Schools & Families (DCSF), and across government and business.	
Texas Wesleyan University	Texas Wesleyan University, founded in 1890 in Fort Worth, is a United Methodist institution with a tradition in the liberal arts and sciences with professional and career preparation.	
Northern Michigan University	Northern Michigan University, located in Michigan's Upper Peninsula, is a four-year, public university that offers 180-degree programs to nearly 9,400 undergraduate and graduate students.	
International Spaceflight Museum	The International Spaceflight Museum is a museum in the virtual world of Second Life. It hosts exhibits and events about real-world spacecraft, rockets, astronomy and exploration.	

== See also ==
- Second Life
- NOAA
