= Sympa (company) =

- Type: Private
- Industry: Software
- Founded: 2005
- Headquarters: Finland
- Products: HRIS, HR Software
- Website: www.sympa.com

Sympa Ltd. was founded in 2005 in Lahti, Finland, by Keijo Karjalainen and Taina Karjalainen. Initially launched as a local HR software solution, Sympa has grown into one of the fastest-growing HR suite vendors in the Nordic region, expanding its presence across Europe.

== History ==
In 2013 Red Herring magazine featured Sympa as one of Europe's most promising startups and included the company on The Red Herring Top 100 Europe list.

In 2016, the Swedish investment firm Alfvén & Didrikson acquired a minority stake in Sympa to support its international growth. Four years later, in August 2020, Providence Strategic Growth (PSG), the growth equity affiliate of Providence Equity Partners, made a majority investment in the company. The investment aimed to accelerate Sympa’s product development, enable strategic mergers and acquisitions, and further expand its European footprint. Following the deal, Alfvén & Didrikson retained a minority stake alongside Sympa’s founding team.

At the time of the PSG investment, Sympa had 140 employees across 8 offices in 5 countries and was used by over 700 organisations, including companies such as BMW, Dustin, and Byggmax. The platform was reportedly accessed more than 650,000 times per month across more than 100 countries.

== Platform ==
Sympa is a human resources information system (HRIS) developed in Finland. Designed for mid-sized to large organisations, the platform supports the full employee lifecycle and is used by companies operating in multiple countries in Europe and the rest of the world. Sympa is known for its focus on configurability, local compliance and extensive integration capabilities.

Sympa operates as a software as a service (SaaS) model and its platform offers tools to manage the full range of HR processes including employee lifecycle management, onboarding, performance reviews, learning and development, compensation and offboarding. Its design supports multi-country and multi-entity organisations, allowing HR teams to align global people strategies while maintaining local compliance with employment laws and practices.

A key feature of the platform is Scenarios, a workforce planning tool that enables HR professionals and business leaders to model organisational changes. This functionality supports strategic decision-making and cross-functional collaboration.

Sympa also includes extensive reporting and analytics tools tailored to HR needs. The system offers dynamic and customisable reports for tracking metrics like headcount, compensation and pay transparency, as well as reports that support compliance with regulations such as GDPR and ESG.

The system integrates with hundreds of third-party applications and offers an open API to support custom workflows and data synchronisation across systems.
