= Federal Office for Building and Regional Planning =

German federal agency

Federal Office for Building and Regional Planning (BBR)

Agency overview
- Jurisdiction: Germany
- Headquarters: Bonn
- Employees: 1,700+
- Annual budget: €154.42 million (2024)
- Agency executives: Petra Wesseler, President; Markus Dürig, Vice President
- Parent department: Federal Ministry for Housing, Urban Development and Building
- Website: www.bbr.bund.de

Federal Office for Building and Regional Planning (BBR; German: Bundesamt für Bauwesen und Raumordnung) is a German federal agency under the jurisdiction of the Federal Ministry for Housing, Urban Development and Building. It was established in 1998 and is headquartered at Schloss Deichmannsaue, Bonn, with additional offices in Berlin and Cottbus.

== History ==
The Federal Office was established in 1998 through the merger of the Federal Building Directorate (BBD) and the Federal Research Institute for Regional Geography and Spatial Planning (BfLR) and was expanded on 1 January 2004 to include the Federal Building Offices I and II of the Berlin Oberfinanzdirektion (Senior Finance Directorate). The BBR is responsible for overseeing major Federal building projects in Germany and abroad. The BBSR, as Departments I and II of the BBR, supports the Cabinet of Germany with expert scientific advice in the areas of construction and housing, spatial planning, and urban development.

Since 1998, the Office has published the yearbook Bau und Raum (Construction and Space), which reports on the Federal Government's most important construction and research projects. The yearbook is available in German/English and can be purchased in bookstores or, since the 2011/12 yearbook, from the BBR's own publishing department.

The Federal Office has been subordinate to different federal ministries as responsibility for the construction sector shifted. From 1998, it was subordinate to the Federal Ministry of Transport, Building and Housing, which was renamed the Federal Ministry of Transport, Building and Urban Development in 2005. In 2013, the Federal Office was transferred to the Federal Ministry for the Environment, Nature Conservation, Building and Nuclear Safety, and in 2018 to the Federal Ministry of the Interior, Building and Community. By organizational decree of 8 December 2021, the Chancellor ordered the transfer to the remit of the Federal Ministry for Housing, Urban Development and Building.

== Organization ==
The BBR is structured into two main sections: the construction sector, which oversees federal construction projects, and the research sector, which is organized under the BBSR. The BBR is led by a president. The current president, since 2015, is Petra Wesseler, and the vice president is Markus Dürig.
