= Direct digital marketing =

Marketing method

Direct digital marketing is a marketing method that uses such things as a consumer's email to send advertisements and other forms of communications to a target audience. Direct marketing campaigns feature calls-to-action that allow marketers to track and measure responses consumers have to marketing campaigns. The personalization and targeting capabilities of direct digital marketing have proven effective. The direct digital marketing has been done directly with the help of other digital medium options such as e-mail, web service, and social media platforms. It is easier to achieve goals in direct digital marketing as compared to traditional marketing. Another advantage of direct marketing is the cost reduction. By using digital marketing resources, companies lower their mail costs. E-mail marketing is much more affordable for companies in terms of marketing and directly reaching consumers. Businesses interact with customers through email, web browsers, mobile applications, social media sites, and other digital media channels. E-mail marketing is considered one of the key marketing solutions besides content and social media marketing.

== History of digital marketing ==
Earlier, traditional direct marketing was achieved by using a customer’s postal address. Digital marketing is very similar to direct digital marketing. As the internet and social media began to grow, so did marketing through those platforms. Specifically, email marketing and text message marketing greatly expanded with the expanding technology. As digital platforms grew, marketers started using email and text messages for advertising, adapting to changes in technology and how people shop.

== Online ecosystems ==
Ecosystems group around main software providers. These form around social and digital marketing when new standards and designs are created. Companies such as Apple and Google have created their own online ecosystems. Companies like Apple and Google are also able to be interfered with by regulators of ecosystems. In marketing, ecosystems have less coherence than in Information Technology (IT).
