= GNU Mailman =

Mailing list manager software

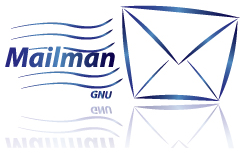

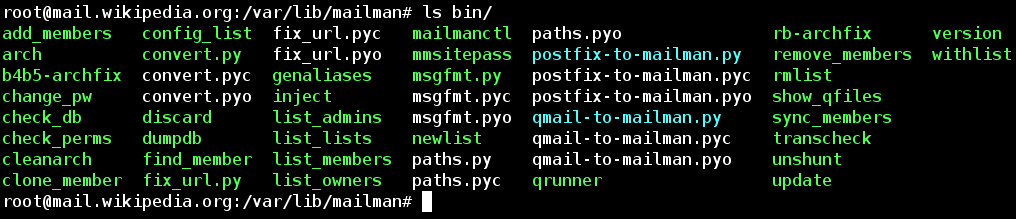
- Mailman files
- Developer: Abhilash Raj
- Release: July 30, 1999; 27 years ago
Stable release
- 3: 3.3.10 / 1 October 2024
- 2: 2.1.39 / 13 December 2021
- Written in: Mostly Python, some C
- Operating system: Unix-like
- Available in: Many languages
- Type: Mailing list management software
- License: 3: GPL-3.0-or-later; 2: GPL-2.0-or-later
- Website: www.list.org
- Repository: gitlab.com/mailman

GNU Mailman is a computer software application from the GNU Project for managing electronic mailing lists. Mailman is coded primarily in Python and currently maintained by Abhilash Raj. Mailman is free software, licensed under the GNU General Public License.

== History ==
A very early version of Mailman was written by John Viega while a graduate student, who then lost his copy of the source in a hard drive crash sometime around 1998. Ken Manheimer at Corporation for National Research Initiatives (CNRI), who was looking for a replacement for Majordomo, then took over development. When Manheimer left CNRI, Barry Warsaw took over. Mailman 3, the first major new version in over a decade, was released in April 2015.

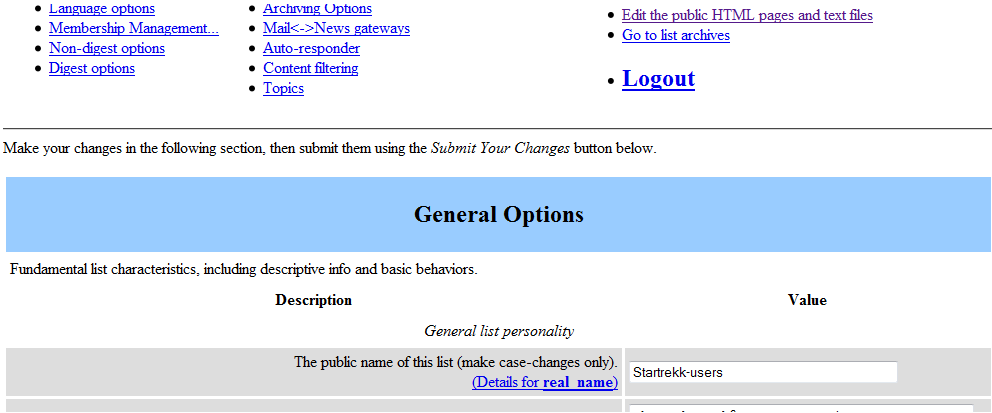
Web administration interface for GNU Mailman 2.1

== Features ==
Mailman runs on most Unix-like systems, including Linux. Since Mailman 3.0 it has required Python-3.4 or newer. It works with Unix-style mail servers, such as Exim, Postfix, Sendmail and qmail. Features include:

- A customizable publicly-accessible Web page for each mailing list.
- Web application for list administration, archiving of messages, spam filtering, etc. Separate interfaces are available for users (for self-administration), moderators (to accept/reject list posts), and administrators.
- Support for multiple administrators and moderators for each list.
- Per-list privacy features, such as closed-subscriptions, private archives, private membership rosters, and sender-based posting rules.
- Integrated bounce detection and automatic handling of bouncing addresses.
- Integrated spam filters
- Majordomo-style email based commands.
- Support for virtual domains.
- List archiving. The default archiver provided with Mailman 2 is Pipermail, although other archivers can be used instead. The archiver for Mailman 3 is HyperKitty.

== See also ==
- List of mailing list software
- Electronic mailing list
