= Colonius =

Tower in Cologne

Coordinates: 50°56′50″N 6°55′55″E

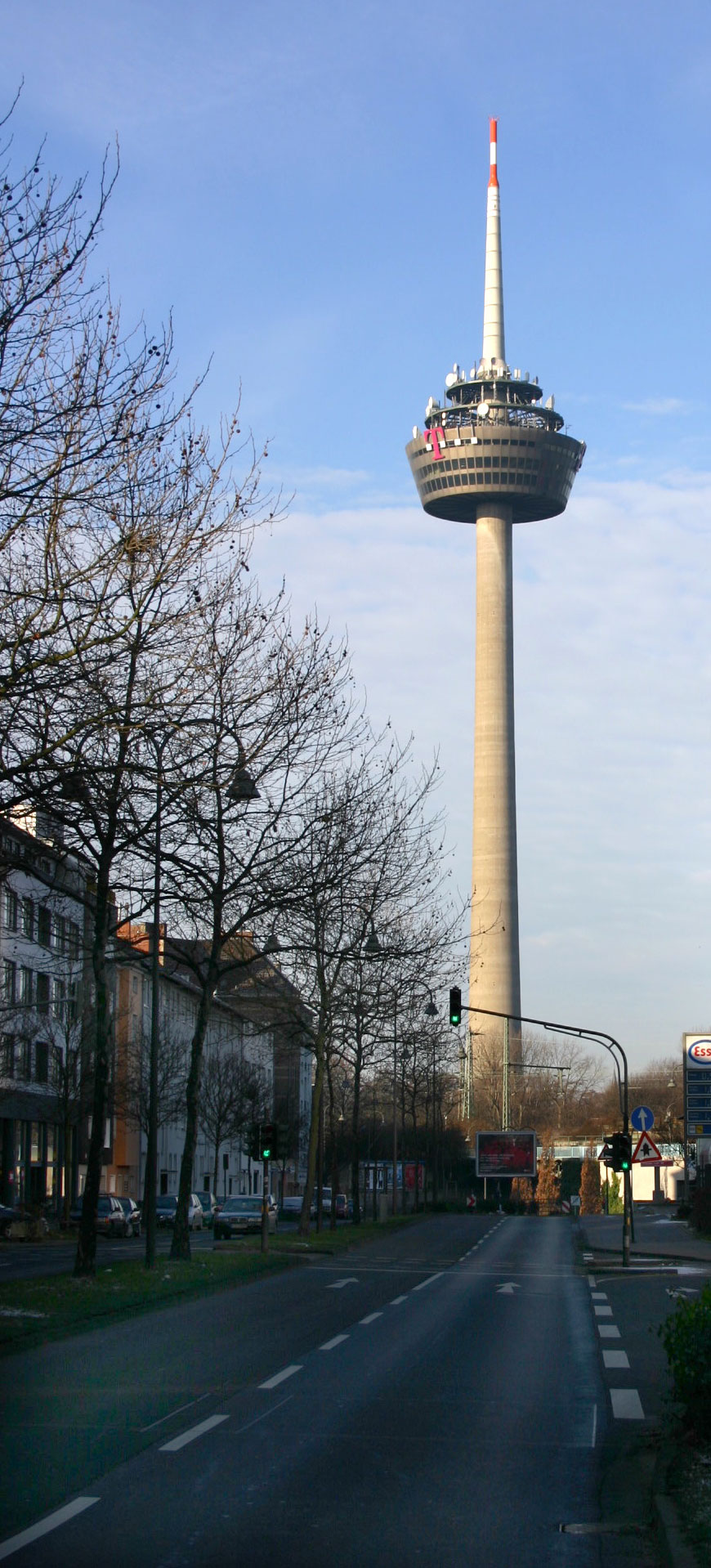
Colonius

Colonius is the Cologne telecommunications tower, which was finished in 1981. The Colonius possesses a cafeteria, viewing platform, and a restaurant, apart from antennas for radio relay and radio services within the VHF range. Because of a missing leaseholder the restaurant has been closed since 1994, and the viewing area closed since 1999 for fire safety reasons. At the time of its completion the Colonius was 252.9 meters high. In 2004 a radio tower added by helicopter increased the height to 266 meters. This addition allowed the broadcast of digital television (DVB-T) from the tower in the Cologne/Bonn region.

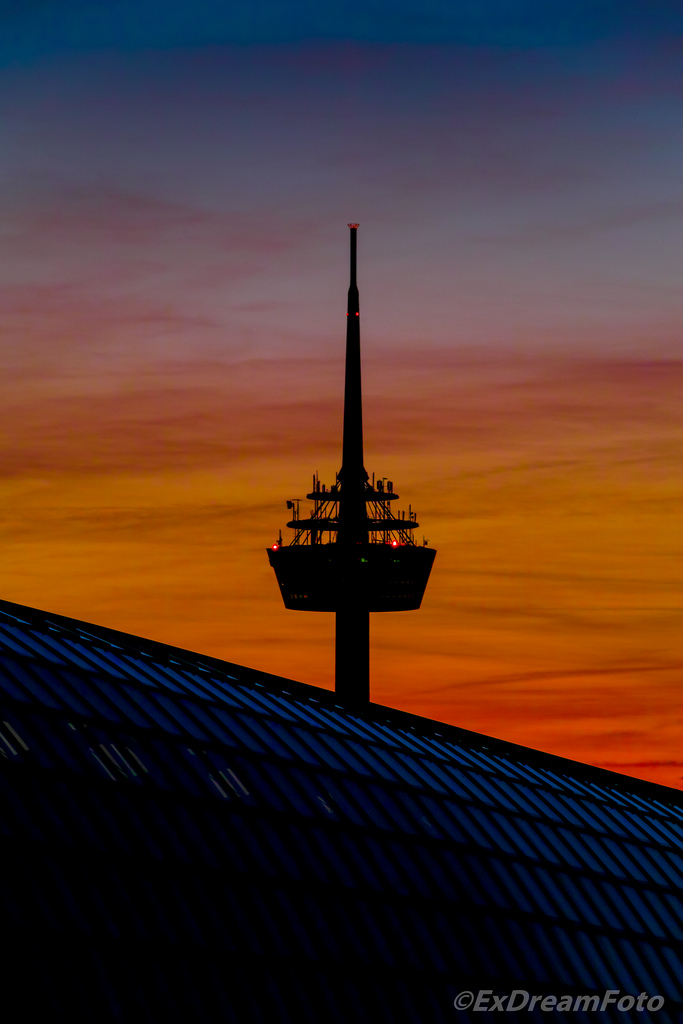
Colonius at sunset

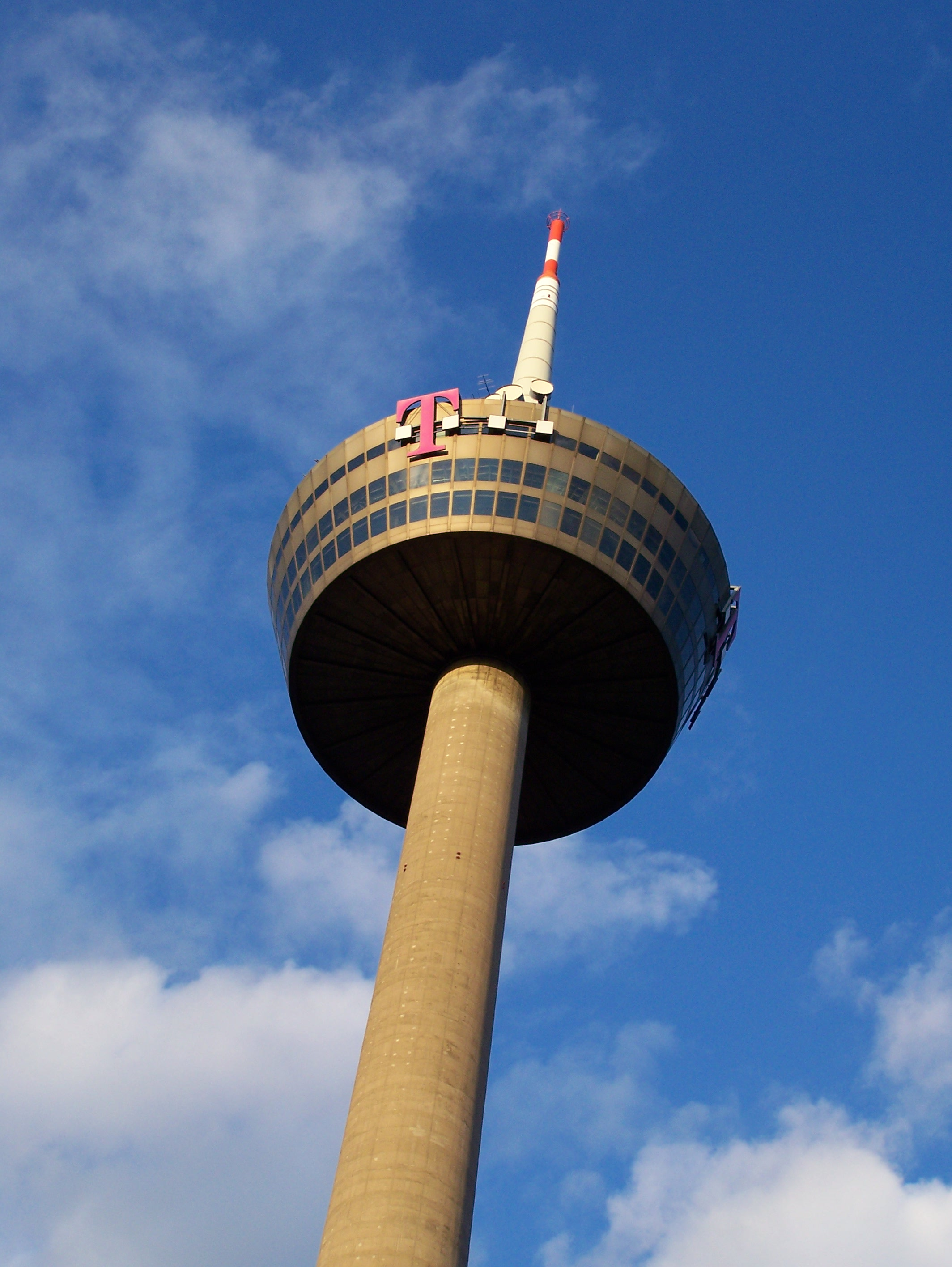
Colonius, telecommunications tower
