= Mailing list =

System or list for multiple mail recipients

A mailing list is a collection of names and addresses used by an individual or an organization to send material to multiple recipients.

Mailing lists are often rented or sold. If rented, the renter agrees to use the mailing list only at the times contractually agreed upon. The mailing list owner typically enforces this by "salting" (known as "seeding" in direct mail) the mailing list with fake addresses and creating new salts for each time the list is rented. Unscrupulous renters may attempt to bypass salts by renting several lists and merging them to find common, valid addresses.

Mailing list brokers exist to help organizations rent their lists. For some list owners, such as specialized niche publications or charitable groups, their lists may be among their most valuable assets, and mailing list brokers help them maximize their value. Transmission may be paper-based or electronic. Each has its strengths, although a 2022 article claimed that compared to email, "direct mail still brings in the lion's share of revenue for most organizations."

== Electronic mailing list ==
An electronic mailing list, or email list, is a specialized use of email that enables the widespread distribution of information to many Internet users. It is similar to a traditional mailing list – a list of names and addresses – as might be kept by an organization for sending publications to its members or customers, but typically refers to four things:

- a list of email addresses,
- the people ("subscribers") receiving mail at those addresses, thus defining a community gathered around a topic of interest,
- the publications (email messages) sent to those addresses, and
- a reflector, which is a single email address that, when designated as the recipient of a message, will send a copy of that message to all of the subscribers.

=== Email discussion list ===
An email discussion list is an electronic mailing list subtype designed to facilitate conversations among list members (subscribers). The generic term, listserv, sometimes refers to an email discussion list, although LISTSERV^{®} is a registered trademark of L-Soft International, Inc. In relevant jurisdictions, it is trademark misuse to use listserv to refer to other electronic mailing list software applications or email discussion lists generally.

=== Mechanism ===
Electronic mailing lists usually are fully or partially automated through the use of special mailing list software and a reflector address set up on a server capable of receiving email. Incoming messages sent to the reflector address are processed by the software, and, depending on their content, are acted upon internally (in the case of messages containing commands directed at the software itself) or are distributed to all email addresses subscribed to the mailing list.

A web-based interface is often available to allow people to subscribe, unsubscribe, and change their preferences. However, mailing list servers existed long before the World Wide Web, so most also accept commands via email to a dedicated address. This allows subscribers (or those who want to be subscribers) to perform tasks such as subscribing or unsubscribing, temporarily halting message delivery to them, or changing available preferences – all via email. The common format for sending these commands is to email the command, followed by the name of the electronic mailing list it pertains to. Examples: subscribe anylist or subscribe anylist John Doe.

Electronic mailing list servers may be set to forward messages to subscribers of a particular mailing list either individually as they are received by the list server, or in digest form, in which all messages received on a particular day by the list server are combined into one email that is sent once per day to subscribers. Some mailing lists allow individual subscribers to decide how they prefer to receive messages from the list server (individual or digest).

== History ==
Mailing lists were first scholarly mailing lists. The genealogy of mailing lists as a communication tool between scientists can be traced back to the times of the fledgling Arpanet. The aim of the computer scientists involved in this project was to develop protocols for the communication between computers. In so doing, they have also built the first tools of human computer-mediated communication. Broadly speaking, scholarly mailing lists can be seen as the modern version of the salons of the Enlightenment, designed by scholars for scholars.

The "threaded conversation" structure, in which the header of a first post defines the topic of a series of answers, constituting a thread, is a common structure of discourse on Internet lists and forums. It contributes to the structure and topicality of debates within mailing lists. Flame wars provide information for historians seeking to understand what is at stake in communities gathered around lists.

Anthropologists, sociologists and historians have used mailing lists as fieldwork. Topics include TV series fandom, online culture, or scientific practices among many other academic studies. From the historian's point of view, preserving mailing list heritage (and Internet fora heritage in general) is essential. Not only has the text of the corpus of messages yet to be perennially archived, but also their related metadata, timestamps, headers that define topics, etc. Mailing lists archives are a unique opportunity for historians to explore interactions, debates, even tensions that reveal a lot about communities.

== List security ==
On both discussion lists and newsletter lists, precautions are taken to avoid spamming.

Companies sending out promotional newsletters, for example, have the option to work with whitelist mail distributors, which agree to standards and face high fines from ISPs should any of the opt-in subscribers complain. In exchange for their compliance and agreement to prohibitive fines, the emails sent by whitelisted companies are not blocked by spam filters, which often can reroute these legitimate, non-spam emails.

=== Subscription ===
Some mailing lists are open to anyone who wants to join them, while others require approval from the list owner before one may join. Joining a mailing list is called "subscribing" and leaving a list is called "unsubscribing".

=== Archives ===
A mailing list archive is a collection of past messages from one or more electronic mailing lists. Such archives often include searching and indexing functionality. Many archives are directly associated with mailing lists, but some organizations, such as Gmane, collect archives from multiple mailing lists hosted by different organizations; thus, a message sent to a popular mailing list may end up in many different archives. Gmane had over 9,000 mailing list archives as of January 16, 2007. Some popular free software programs for collecting mailing list archives are Hypermail, MHonArc, FUDforum, and public-inbox (which is notably used for archiving the Linux kernel mailing list along with many other software development mailing lists and has a web-service API used by search-and-retrieval tools intended for use by the Linux kernel development community).

== Listwashing ==
Listwashing is the process through which individual entries in mailing lists are removed. These mailing lists typically contain email addresses or phone numbers of those that have not voluntarily subscribed. Only complainers are removed via this process. Because most of those who have not voluntarily subscribed remain on the list, this helps spammers maintain a low-complaint list of email addresses to spam. Internet service providers that forward complaints to the spammer are often seen as assisting the spammer in list washing, or, in short, helping spammers. Most legitimate list holders provide their customers with listwashing and data deduplication service regularly for no charge or a small fee.

== See also ==
- CAN-SPAM Act of 2003
- Computational Chemistry List
- Dgroups
- eGroups
- Data brokers
- Direct digital marketing
- Direct marketing
- Bulk email software
- List of mailing list software
- Linux kernel mailing list
- LISTSERV
- Metab-L
- Netiquette
- Newsletter
- Online consultation
- Robinson list
- Squeeze page
- Usenet

== Publications ==
- Managing Mailing Lists: Majordomo, LISTSERV, Listproc, and SmartList. O'Reilly Media. 1998. ISBN 156592259X.
