= Kremen v. Cohen =

2003 US Court of Appeals cyberlaw case

- Court: United States Court of Appeals for the Ninth Circuit
- Argued: August 13, 2002
- Decided: July 25, 2003
- Citation: 337 F.3d 1024

Holding
- The domain name for a website is an item of property that must be purchased and sold per established contract law, and which can be stolen under criminal law.

Court membership
- Judges sitting: Alex Kozinski, M. Margaret McKeown

Case opinions
- Majority: Alex Kozinski

Keywords
- domain names, contract law, criminal law

Kremen v. Cohen, 337 F.3d 1024 (9th Cir., 2003), was a court ruling at the United States Court of Appeals for the Ninth Circuit. The ruling was an important early cyberlaw precedent, determining that an Internet domain name is an item of property that can be bought, sold, and stolen.

== Facts ==
Internet entrepreneur Gary Kremen (who later founded Match.com and Clean Power Finance) registered the domain name sex.com with Network Solutions for a nominal fee in 1994. At the time he did not develop a website under that name, and instead decided to focus on building a business at Match.com.

Stephen M. Cohen, who had recently completed a prison sentence after being convicted of fraud, envisioned that a website called "sex.com" could generate significant advertising revenues. When Cohen found that the domain name had already been registered by someone else, he embarked on an effort to acquire it fraudulently. In 1995, Cohen sent a letter to Network Solutions claiming to be a representative of Kremen's company and falsely stating that Kremen had been fired from the firm. Cohen in turn suggested that Network Solutions transfer ownership of the sex.com domain name to himself, because Kremen had apparently abandoned his ownership and Cohen now (supposedly) represented the owning firm.

Network Solutions took Cohen's fraudulent letter at face value, and did no due diligence to find errors in Cohen's reasoning or to contact Kremen to verify that he had abandoned the domain name. Network Solutions then transferred ownership to Cohen. When Kremen learned of the ruse and contacted Network Solutions, he was told that the transfer was complete and he was no longer the rightful owner of the domain name.

Cohen then developed a website called sex.com and quickly generated millions of dollars in revenues. In 1998 Kremen filed suit against both Cohen and Network Solutions for fraud.

== District court proceedings ==
The case was first heard at the District Court for the Northern District of California. Kremen contended that Cohen and Network Solutions had violated several provisions of contract law, including breach of contract, breach of fiduciary duty, negligent misrepresentation, and conspiracy to convert ownership of property. Network Solutions requested summary judgment, claiming that it had been deceived by Cohen and had no responsibility to Kremen.

The district court determined that Network Solutions had not committed fraud because as the provider of a basic service to register domain names upon request, there had been no actual contract when Kremen originally registered sex.com. This also absolved Network Solutions from fiduciary responsibility toward Kremen. On the matter of conspiracy to convert the ownership of property, the district court noted that, at the time, there was no settled law on whether a domain name was an item of intangible property that could be stolen. That question was rendered moot by this interpretation. Finally, as a party that was allegedly deceived by Cohen's fraudulent actions, Network Solutions had not committed negligent misrepresentation itself. Thus, the company's request for summary judgment was granted and it was absolved from direct responsibility for the fraud committed against Kremen.

In a separate proceeding, the district court ruled that Cohen had committed fraud, and rendered his ownership of sex.com to be void because he had acquired the domain name via a fraudulent letter to Network Solutions. Based on calculations of revenues that Kremen could have made if he had developed his own website called sex.com, he was awarded $40 million in compensatory damages and another $25 million in punitive damages.

Cohen appealed the district court ruling in which he was ordered to pay damages to Kremen, but his request was rejected by the Ninth Circuit in 2003 and he was again ordered to pay Kremen the grand total of $65 million. Meanwhile Kremen, despite winning a substantial monetary award against Cohen, appealed the district court ruling in which Network Solutions was absolved of liability.

== Circuit court opinion ==
The Ninth Circuit Court of Appeals reviewed the lower court's decision in favor of Network Solutions. The circuit court upheld most of the judgment, except on the matter of conversion of ownership of the domain name. Whereas the lower court had concluded that the law of domain names as intangible property was unsettled and this justified dismissing the complaint against Network Solutions, the circuit court held that a solution could be found in the common law of contracts. Under this interpretation, Network Solutions had violated contract law by giving away Kremen's property without due diligence and by carelessly accepting Cohen's fraudulent representations. This matter was then remanded to the district court to determine if Network Solutions should pay monetary damages to Kremen. This dispute was eventually settled out of court.

== Impact and subsequent events ==
Kremen v. Cohen, and the events leading up to the dispute, were called "really bizarre" (emphasis in original) by the Ninth Circuit. Stephen M. Cohen was ordered to pay $65 million to Gary Kremen, but claimed that he did not have that much money despite the success of his fraudulent sex.com website. Cohen declared personal bankruptcy and absconded to Mexico, where he eluded capture for several years until being deported by Mexican authorities for immigration violations in 2005. In the meantime, Kremen had offered a reward for Cohen's capture, which Kremen advertised on his own version of the sex.com website. Despite several additional court orders, Cohen has never paid the ordered damages to Kremen and continues to claim poverty.

The case illustrated the value of strategically constructed domain names on the World Wide Web, which in turn inspired questionable actions by parties who wished to control other such website addresses. The case also revealed the need to consider whether traditional contract law was equipped to handle the buying and selling, and even the theft, of domain names as the World Wide Web developed.

Despite never receiving his $65 million judgment from Cohen, Kremen later made use of the sex.com domain after he regained ownership, and in 2006 he sold the domain name for $14 million, which at the time was the largest amount ever paid in such a transaction. The saga was the topic of the book Sex.com: One Domain, Two Men, Twelve Years and the Brutal Battle for the Jewel in the Internet's Crown by journalist Kieren McCarthy.
