= Popehat =

Blog about internet-related American law

Popehat is a law-oriented blog. According to its tagline, Popehat is a "group complaint about law, liberty, and leisure". Its primary blogger, American attorney Ken White, writes about law, scams, and freedom of expression on the Internet in a blunt, often crass style. In December 2022, Popehat left Twitter, citing Elon Musk's takeover of the site as a contributing factor.

== History ==
Popehat was established in 2005, "aborted because we have lives", and restarted in 2007. After having a low profile for many years, the blog came to widespread attention in 2012 for its coverage of The Oatmeal and FunnyJunk legal dispute involving Charles Carreon, as well as the US Olympic Committee's cease and desist letters to knitters on Ravelry for scheduling a "Ravelypmics." It has also covered swatting, IsAnybodyDown?, Prenda Law, scam letters, and SLAPP issues. The blog sometimes helps arrange pro bono counsel for affected bloggers (the "Popehat Signal"), including PZ Myers.

It has been repeatedly linked by Boing Boing, Instapundit, John Scalzi, Techdirt, and others and was included in the ABA Journal "Blawg 100" in 2011, 2012, 2013, and 2014. In 2015, Popehat was inducted into the ABA Journal Blawg Hall of Fame.

The blog was originally anonymous but White's identity was eventually uncovered. White, a former assistant US attorney, is a partner at Brown, White and Osborn as of 2025. White's fellow bloggers (anonymous or known to various degrees) have included Adam Steinbaugh, Charles, David, Derrick, Grandy, Marc Randazza, Patrick, and a bovine character named Via Angus.

In January 2009, the Popehat Twitter account was established. Known for updating his handle to reflect Twitter's trending topic of the day, primary tweeter Ken White commented on legal issues in a humorous but substantive way. He generally advocated for broad free speech rights and reform of the criminal justice system.

In August 2020, the original blog website announced that it was being discontinued and would be preserved only as a historical artifact, with new posts going to a replacement Substack site instead. Popehat has since left Substack to publish under its own URL, www.popehat.com.

Popehat's Twitter account was cited in 2021 as helping spearhead sarcastic responses to Texas Representative Dan Crenshaw's form for Internet users to submit stories of "woke" impositions on the military.

Ken White left Twitter in December 2022.

=== DPRK News Service ===
Two of the blog's writers, Patrick (who died in September 2022) and Derrick, run a satirical Twitter feed purporting to be the voice of North Korea which parodies the style and content of North Korean state media. Greta van Susteren, Slate, the Washington Post, Newsweek, CNN, and Reuters Australia have mistakenly identified the feed as authentic. On the MSNBC television program Morning Joe, journalist Mark Halperin cited the feed as evidence that the government of North Korea was expressing support for Donald Trump.
