= Charles Carreon =

American trial attorney

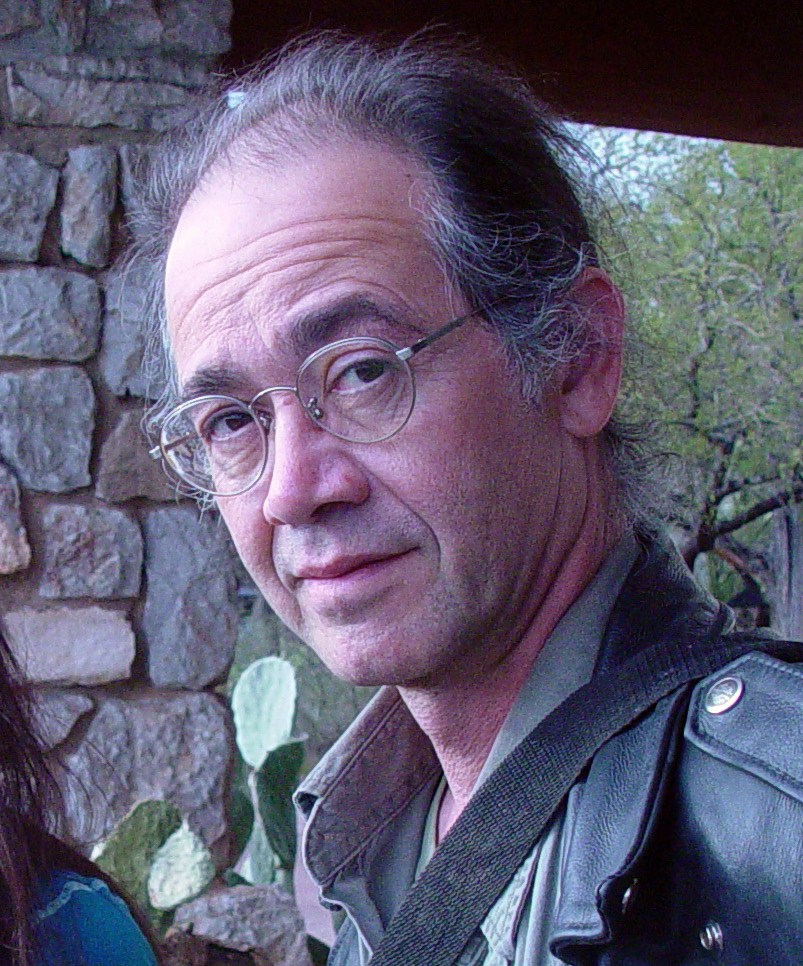
- (November 2008)
- Born: Charles Hernan Carreon; April 7, 1956 (age 70); Phoenix, Arizona
- Education: Southern Oregon State College; UCLA School of Law
- Occupation: Attorney
- Known for: The Oatmeal and FunnyJunk legal dispute, Sex.com case, internet law
- Spouse(s): Tara Lyn Carreon (1974-present)

Charles Hernan Carreon (born April 7, 1956) is an American trial attorney best known for his involvement in a legal dispute between The Oatmeal webcomic and content aggregator FunnyJunk. As of 2012, he represented individuals and companies in matters pertaining to Internet law.

== Life and career ==
Carreon was admitted to the State Bar of California in 1987 and the Oregon State Bar in 1993.

In October 2005, Carreon was suspended by the Oregon State Bar for 60 days for the unlawful practice of law and failing to deposit or maintain client funds in trust.

In September 2006, Carreon was suspended for two years by the State Bar of California, stayed, and placed on two years of probation with an actual 60-day suspension for violating his duty to maintain client funds in trust, and for practicing without a license in Canada.

Carreon and his wife have two daughters. Their son Joshua died in 2007.

=== Sex.com ===
Carreon was part of the legal team that successfully litigated the Sex.com domain-name rights case.

The sex.com rights case was brought after entrepreneur Gary Kremen lost control of the domain to Stephen M. Cohen. The case took six years, with a $65 million judgment awarded to Kremen in 2001. Carreon later brought a suit against Kremen over compensation for the case. In 2008, Carreon self-published his account of events as The Sex.com Chronicles.

=== American Buddha ===
Carreon represents American Buddha, which he describes as a non-profit religious organization whose director and librarian is his wife Tara Lyn Carreon.

In 2009, publisher Penguin Group sued American Buddha over the uploading of four copyrighted books for which Penguin holds the rights.

=== The Oatmeal ===
In June 2012, Carreon represented FunnyJunk.com in sending a demand letter alleging defamation and requesting damages from Matthew Inman of The Oatmeal in a long-standing copyright infringement dispute. On June 14, Carreon alleged he suffered "security attacks instigated by Matt Inman".

On June 15, Carreon filed a pro se lawsuit Carreon v. Inman et al. in United States District Court for the Northern District of California in Oakland against IndieGoGo, Inc., the American Cancer Society, and the National Wildlife Federation, for alleged improprieties related to an Oatmeal charity fundraiser created in response to the FunnyJunk demand. Carreon stated he planned to subpoena Twitter and Ars Technica to determine the identity of the creator of a fake Twitter account which parodied Carreon. On June 21, the Electronic Frontier Foundation announced they were joining with the lead lawyer representing Inman, stating, "This lawsuit is a blatant attempt to abuse the legal process to punish a critic."

Lawyer Rebecca E. Hoffman of Bloomberg BNA said Carreon's case could "only be described as frivolity on top of frivolousness" (referring to the concept of frivolous litigation). On June 25, Carreon amended his lawsuit against Inman and the other defendants to include Kamala Harris, the state Attorney General of California. Carreon also requested a temporary restraining order to stop disbursement of the donations. Carreon filed a notice of voluntary dismissal in his suit against all parties on July 3. In July 2012, Carreon founded the website rapeutation.com and released a music video which mocks Inman. Carreon also alleges that online commentary about him constitutes a "distributed internet reputation attack". Mashable named Carreon's case first among their list of "silliest tech lawsuits ever", and InfoWorld's Robert X. Cringely wrote that Carreon's actions made him "Internet Enemy No. 1".

Carreon also indicated his interest in finding and then suing the owner of satirical site charles-carreon.com, leading Public Citizen to seek a federal declaratory judgment to protect the satirical site's owner.

In April 2013, Carreon effectively lost the battle and was ordered to pay $46,100.25 (USD) in legal fees.

In September 2013, Carreon dropped his final appeal in the case, saying, "it was a dumb thing" and "I made it worse".
