= List of most expensive domain names =

This article lists the most expensive domain name sales, with values of $3 million USD or more.

== Most expensive domain names ==
This list is limited to pure domain name and cash-only sales. Sales which included website content or involved equity deals are not listed.

Note that the Price (USD), Year, Seller, and Buyer columns show the highest recorded cash sale for each domain name.

Most expensive domain names
Domain	Year	Price		Seller	Buyer	Note	Ref
Domain	Year	Nominal	Adjusted	Seller	Buyer	Note	Ref
AI.com	2025	$70,000,000	$70,000,000	Arsyan Ismail	Kris Marszalek		
Voice.com	2019	$30,000,000	$37,778,212	MicroStrategy	Block.one		
360.com	2015	$17,000,000	$23,090,692	Vodafone	360 Security Technology		
Chat.com	2023	$15,500,000	$16,378,604	Unknown	Dharmesh Shah	Shortly after he purchased it, Dharmesh Shah sold Chat.com to OpenAI for an undisclosed amount, with the transaction reportedly including OpenAI shares.	
NFTs.com	2022	$15,000,000	$16,502,729	Unknown	Unknown	The buyer and seller have not been publicly disclosed; prior to March 2021, Whois records listed an unknown owner in Monaco, and before that the domain was owned by the domain investor Get on the Web.	
Rocket.com	2024	$14,000,000	$14,368,304	L3Harris	Rocket Companies	The domain was previously owned by Aerojet-General Corporation, which was acquired by L3Harris Technologies, Inc. in 2023, who was later reported to be the seller.	
Sex.com	2010	$13,000,000	$19,193,499	Escom	Clover Holdings Ltd	Sex.com has changed hands multiple times for large sums and was the subject of a high-profile legal dispute; see the main Sex.com article for further details.	
Icon.com	2025	$12,000,000	$12,315,689	Unknown	Icon		
Tesla.com	2014	$11,000,000	$14,959,938	Stuart Grossman	Tesla	Tesla.com was acquired by Tesla Motors from Stuart Grossman, who previously defended the domain against a dispute from Tesla Industries. The sale price was later revealed by Elon Musk in a tweet.	
Hotels.com	2001	$11,000,000	$20,000,940	Unknown	Hotels.com	Hotel Reservations Network acquired the domain and rebranded as Hotels.com in 2002, before being acquired by Expedia.	
Connect.com	2022	$10,000,000	$11,001,819	Unknown	HubSpot		
Porno.com	2015	$8,888,888	$11,952,829	Rick Schwartz	WGCZ		
Gold.com	2024	$8,500,000	$8,723,613	Unknown	JM Bullion		
FB.com	2010	$8,500,000	$12,549,596	American Farm Bureau Federation	Facebook	The American Farm Bureau Federation uses FB.org as its primary domain. The sale price was disclosed by the Federation during its annual meeting.	
HealthInsurance.com	2019	$8,130,000	$10,237,895	Unknown	Health Insurance Associates, LLC		
We.com	2015	$8,000,000	$10,866,208	Unknown	Tencent	Although the sale was not officially disclosed, both the buyer and price were later reported by industry insiders.	
Diamond.com	2006	$7,500,000	$11,977,963	Internet Real Estate Group	Odimo		
Beer.com	2004	$7,000,000	$11,931,818	Internet Real Estate Group	Interbrew		
Z.com	2014	$6,800,000	$9,247,962	Nissan	GMO Internet		
Slots.com	2010	$5,500,000	$8,120,327	Unknown	Unknown		
Casino.com	2003	$5,500,000	$9,625,995	Boss Media	Mansion Group		
Toys.com	2009	$5,100,000	$7,653,560	eToys.com	Toys "R" Us		
AsSeenOnTv.com	2000	$5,100,000	$9,534,783	Unknown	LA Group, Inc.		
Korea.com	2000	$5,000,000	$9,347,826	Unknown	Unknown		
Clothes.com	2008	$4,900,000	$7,327,280	Idealab	Zappos		
Medicare.com	2014	$4,800,000	$6,527,973	Medx Publishing	eHealthInsurance Services		
IG.com	2013	$4,600,000	$6,357,857				
iCloud.com	2011	$4,500,000	$6,440,459				
AV.com	2021	$4,180,000	$4,966,413				
GiftCard.com	2012	$4,000,000	$5,609,509				
IT.com	2022	$3,800,000	$4,180,691				
YP.com	2008	$3,800,000	$5,682,380				
HG.com	2016	$3,770,000	$5,057,508				
Mi.com	2014	$3,600,000	$4,895,980				
Shop.com	2003	$3,550,000	$6,213,142	Internet Real Estate Group	Altura International		
Ice.com	2018	$3,500,000	$4,487,477				
Hippo.com	2021	$3,300,000	$3,920,852	Unknown	Hippo Enterprises		
Wine.com	2003	$3,300,000	$5,775,597				
AltaVista.com	1998	$3,300,000	$6,518,477				
Software.com	2005	$3,200,000	$5,275,175				
Christmas.com	2020	$3,150,000	$3,918,767				
Floor.com	2021	$3,140,000	$3,730,750				
Whisky.com	2014	$3,100,000	$4,215,983				
Help.com	2023	$3,000,000	$3,170,052				
Yolo.com	2021	$3,000,000	$3,564,411				
Place.com	2021	$3,000,000	$3,564,411				
California.com	2019	$3,000,000	$3,777,821				
Candy.com	2009	$3,000,000	$4,502,094				
Vodka.com	2006	$3,000,000	$4,791,185				
Loans.com	2000	$3,000,000	$5,608,696				
Sex.xxx	2014	$3,000,000	$4,079,983				
