= Australia Post =

Australian postal service

Australian Postal Corporation
- Type: Government business enterprise
- Industry: Postal service
- Predecessor: Australian Postal Commission; Postmaster-General's Department
- Founded: 1 July 1975; 51 years ago in Sydney, Australia
- Headquarters: Melbourne, Australia
- Number of locations: ▼4,118 outlets (FY25)
- Area served: Australia
- Key people: Lucio Di Bartolomeo (Chairman); Paul Graham (CEO)
- Products: Postal services; Retail; Logistics; Printing services; Passport issuing
- Revenue: ▲ A$9.45B (FY25)
- Net income: ▲ A$13.5M (FY25)
- Owner: Australian Government
- Number of employees: c. 64,000 (FY25)
- Subsidiaries: POLi Payments; SecurePay; Decipha
- Website: auspost.com.au

Australia Post, formally the Australian Postal Corporation and also known as AusPost, is an Australian Government-owned corporation that provides postal services throughout Australia. Australia Post's head office is located on Swan Street in Richmond, Victoria.

Australia Post is the successor of the Postmaster-General's Department, which was established at federation in 1901 to formalise colonial postal services. In 1975, the department was abolished and its postal functions were taken over by the Australian Postal Commission. The organisation's current name and structure were adopted in 1989 when it was made into a government-owned corporation.

== History ==
=== Colonial Australia (pre–1901) ===
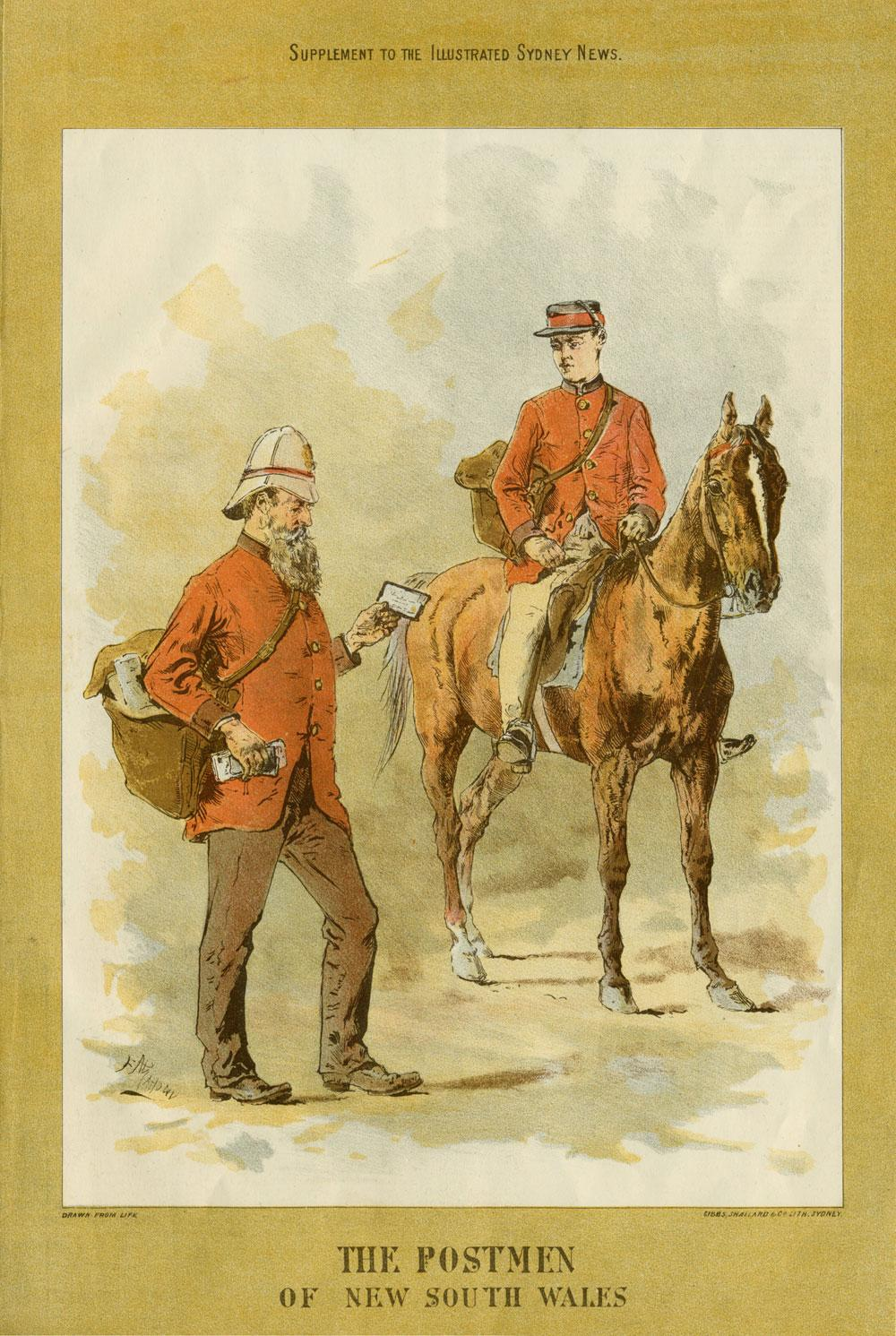
The Postmen of New South Wales (1887)

Before colonial control of mail started in 1809, mail was usually passed on by ad hoc arrangements made between transporters, storekeepers and settlers. These arrangements were flexible, and inherently unstable. It was common for early settlers to ride many miles out of their way to deliver neighbours' mail that had been collected from informal distribution points.

On 10 July 1803, Sydney Gazette announced that boatmen travelling between Sydney and Parramatta could charge two pence, equivalent to A$1.21 in 2022, to deliver a non-government letter.

The first organisation of a postal service in Australia commenced in 1809 with the appointment in Sydney of the first postmaster. An English ex-convict, Isaac Nichols, took the post operating from his home in George Street, Sydney. His main job was to take charge of letters and parcels arriving by ship, to avoid the chaos of people rushing aboard ships as soon as they arrived at Sydney's wharves. Nichols would pick up the mail and post a list of recipients outside his house. He would advertise in the Sydney Gazette the names of all those who received mail. Recipients paid a fixed price of one shilling, equivalent to A$4.76 in 2022, per letter to collect mail from Nichols' home, with parcels costing more depending on how heavy they were. VIP addressees were afforded personal delivery by Nichols.

Between 1812 and 1842, postmasters were also appointed in Tasmania (1812), Western Australia (1829), Victoria (1836), South Australia (1837) and Queensland (1842). Settlements outside of the postmasters' domain were serviced by contractors on horsebacks or in coaches.

In 1825, the New South Wales Legislative Council passed the Postal Act which transferred responsibility from Nichols, acting as a private company, to the governor. The governor would then set the wage of the postmaster and the cost of collecting mail.

=== 20th century ===
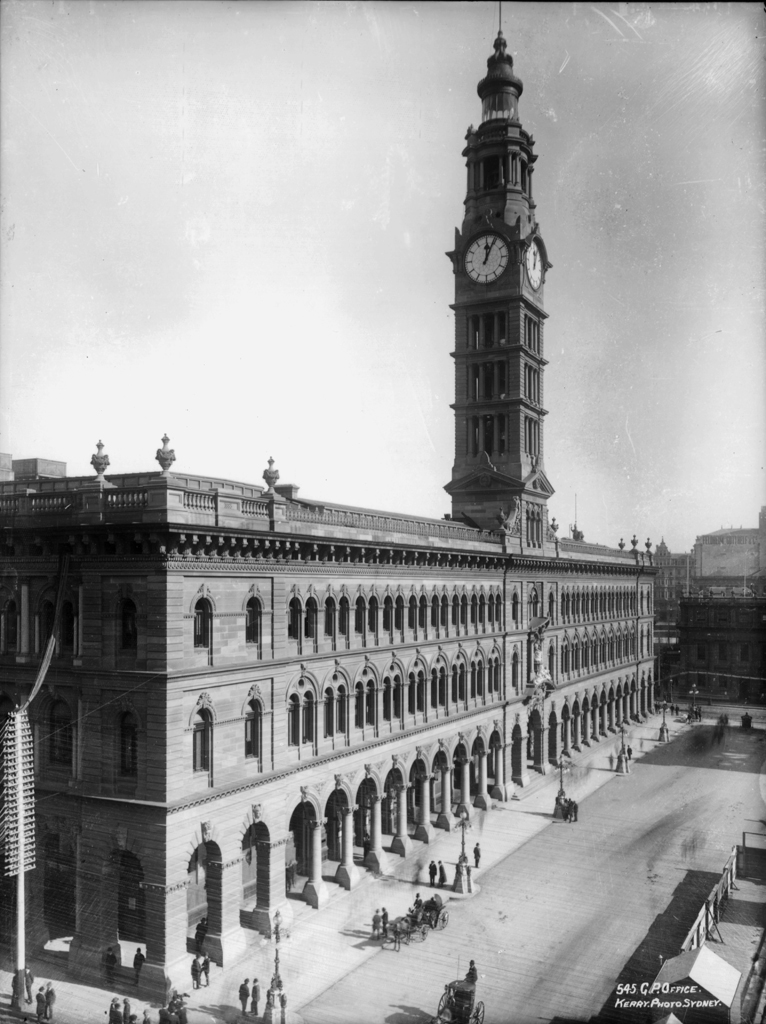
The Sydney General Post Office circa 1900

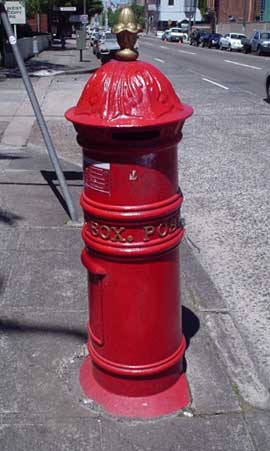
Pillar box in Marrickville

Following federation in 1901, the colonial mail systems were merged into the Postmaster-General's Department (PMG). This body was responsible for telegraph and domestic telephone operations as well as postal mail. An airmail service was introduced in 1914. In 1967, 4-digit postcodes in Australia were introduced, in addition to the world's first mechanical processing centre, which garnered international attention.

On 1 July 1975, separate government commissions were created to undertake the operational responsibilities of the PMG. One of these was the Australian Postal Commission. It later became the Australian Postal Corporation on 1 January 1989 when it was corporatised into what is now known as the Australian Postal Corporation, or Australia Post.

In December 1987, 21-year-old Melbourne University student Frank Vitkovic, while experiencing a mental health crisis, entered the Australian Post building located at 191 Queen Street in Melbourne and spoke animatedly with an unidentified friend who worked in the building, then perpetrated what came to be known as the Queen Street massacre. The mass shooting left eight Australia Post and other company employees dead. The perpetrator fell to his death from the building while struggling with a security guard. The incident resulted in calls to strengthen gun control laws in Australia.

=== 21st century ===
Under amendments to the Australian Postal Corporation Act which came into effect in March 2008, quarantine inspection officers of a state or territory are authorised to request Australia Post to open packets and parcels sent from interstate for inspection when inspectors believe they may contain quarantine material. The legislation also authorises Australia Post to remove any mail articles that are suspected of being scam mail.

In February 2010, Ahmed Fahour was appointed MD (CEO) of Australia Post. In May 2010, he announced a new strategy dubbed "Future Ready" designed to reinvigorate Australia Post. This included a new organisation structure as well as a renewed foray into digital businesses under a strategic business unit called eServices.

However, in 2013, the corporation acknowledged that, though the strategy was successful in improving Australia Post's profitability and structure, it was insufficient in its contributions to their development as a financially self-sustaining business.

In September 2015, the corporation announced its first loss in 30 years. The A$222 million loss, equivalent to A$262.462 million in 2022, was down from a A$116 million profit the previous year. Large decreases in addressed and stamped mail led to a A$381 million loss in the mail delivery side of the business. Parcel delivery then accounted for over half of total revenue. Overall revenue was stable at A$6.37 billion, equivalent to A$7.53 billion in 2022.

In August the following year, Australia Post returned to profit with strong parcel and courier performance, and organisation re-structuring. However, mail performance reached an all-time low.

In February 2017, Australian Prime Minister Malcolm Turnbull criticised CEO Ahmed Fahour's A$5.6 million, equivalent to A$6.4 million in 2022, annual salary, saying "As the Prime Minister and a taxpayer, I've spoken to the chairman today. I think that salary, that remuneration, is too high." On 23 February 2017, Fahour announced his resignation, effective July 2017, telling media that the decision was not related to discussion of his salary.

In October 2019, Australia Post completed a major rebranding project with Melbourne-based brand strategy firm Maud. This project saw the development of a new brand identity, website and self-service platform, parcel and letter packaging, street posting boxes, staff uniforms, and a fleet of custom-designed electric vehicles, amongst others.

In 2019, with parcels deliveries increasing while letter deliveries falling, the Post Office transferred several thousand workers from letters to parcels. Letter deliveries were reduced from five days per week to two days per week.

In 2021, Australia Post began using its first electric trucks; three Fuso Ecanters in Melbourne.

In 2025, Australia Post indefinitely suspended most deliveries to the United States and Puerto Rico, citing tariffs imposed by the Trump administration.

== Operational development ==
Responding to competitive pressures, Australia Post continued to broaden its product and service range in 2019, having invested in extensive technology-based infrastructure programmes. It operates in three core areas: letters and associated services; retail merchandise and agency services; and parcels and logistics. It has a number of subsidiaries and joint ventures, including Sai Cheng Logistics International – a joint-venture logistics company established with China Post in 2005.

Australia Post operates regular mail delivery as well as an express and courier service through Messenger Post (now trading as Startrack Courier).

Australia Post is self-funding and uses its assets and resources to generate profits, which can be reinvested in the business or returned as dividends to its sole shareholder, the Australian Government. Under its community service obligations, Australia Post is committed to providing an accessible, affordable and reliable letter service for all Australians wherever they reside. The corporation reaches more than 10 million Australian addresses; operates 4,330 postal outlets; and serves more than a million customers in postal outlets every business day. When the basic domestic letter rate was increased to A$1.00 on 4 January 2016, there were no changes to prices of concession stamps or seasonal greeting stamps, which remained at A$0.60 and A$0.65 respectively. At the same time, a category of priority mail was introduced (as distinct from regular mail), under which delivery standards were varied and a A$0.50 priority label was required as additional payment for the better standard.

Under the Australian Postal Corporation Act 1989, letters up to 250 grams (8.8 oz) are reserved to Australia Post – other people and businesses can only carry them if they charge four times the basic postage rate. All of the other goods and services provided by Australia Post are sold in fully competitive markets and, in 2005–06, nearly 90 per cent of the corporation's profit (from ordinary activities before net interest and tax) came from selling products and services in competitive markets.

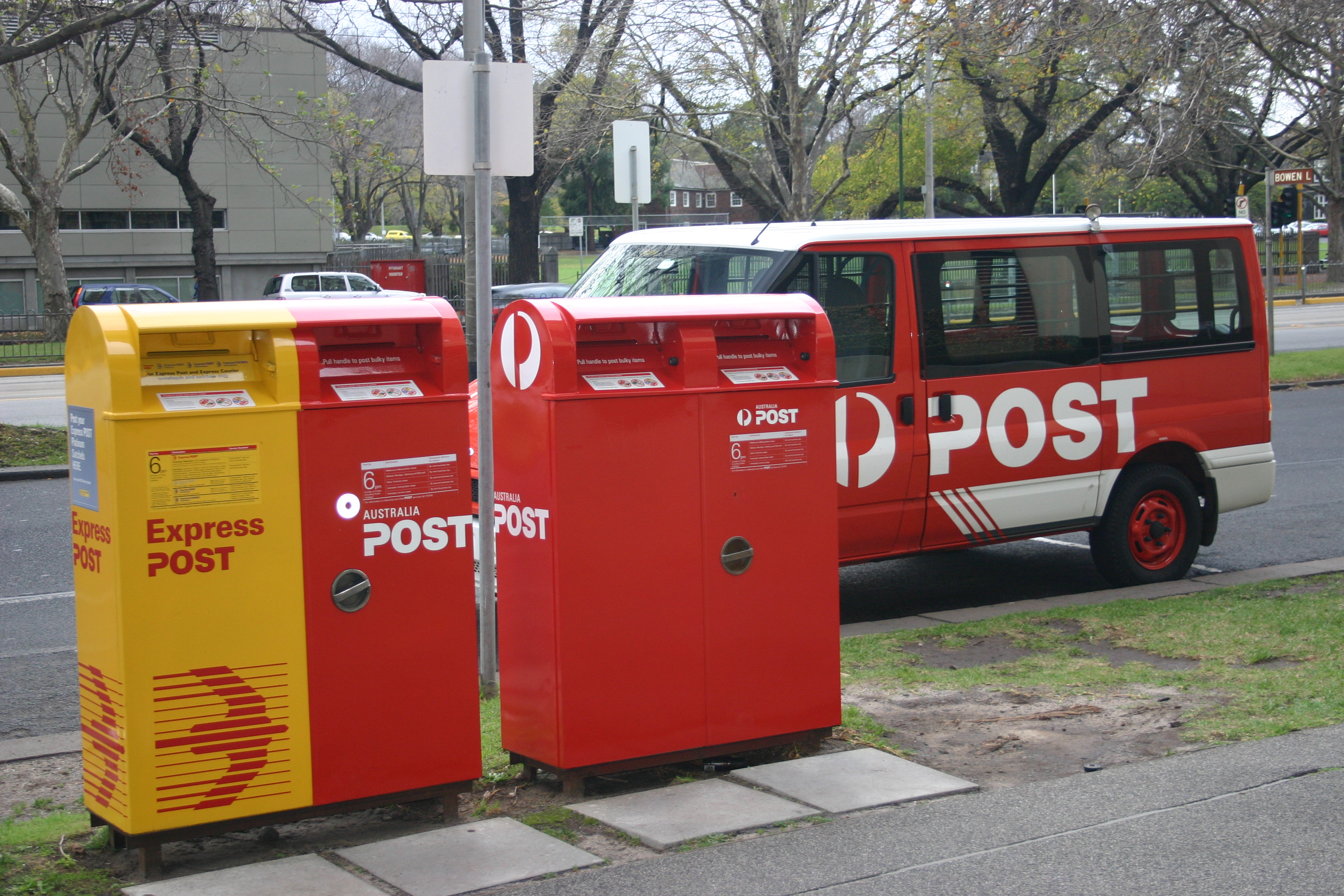
Express (yellow) and normal (red) street posting boxes in 2005

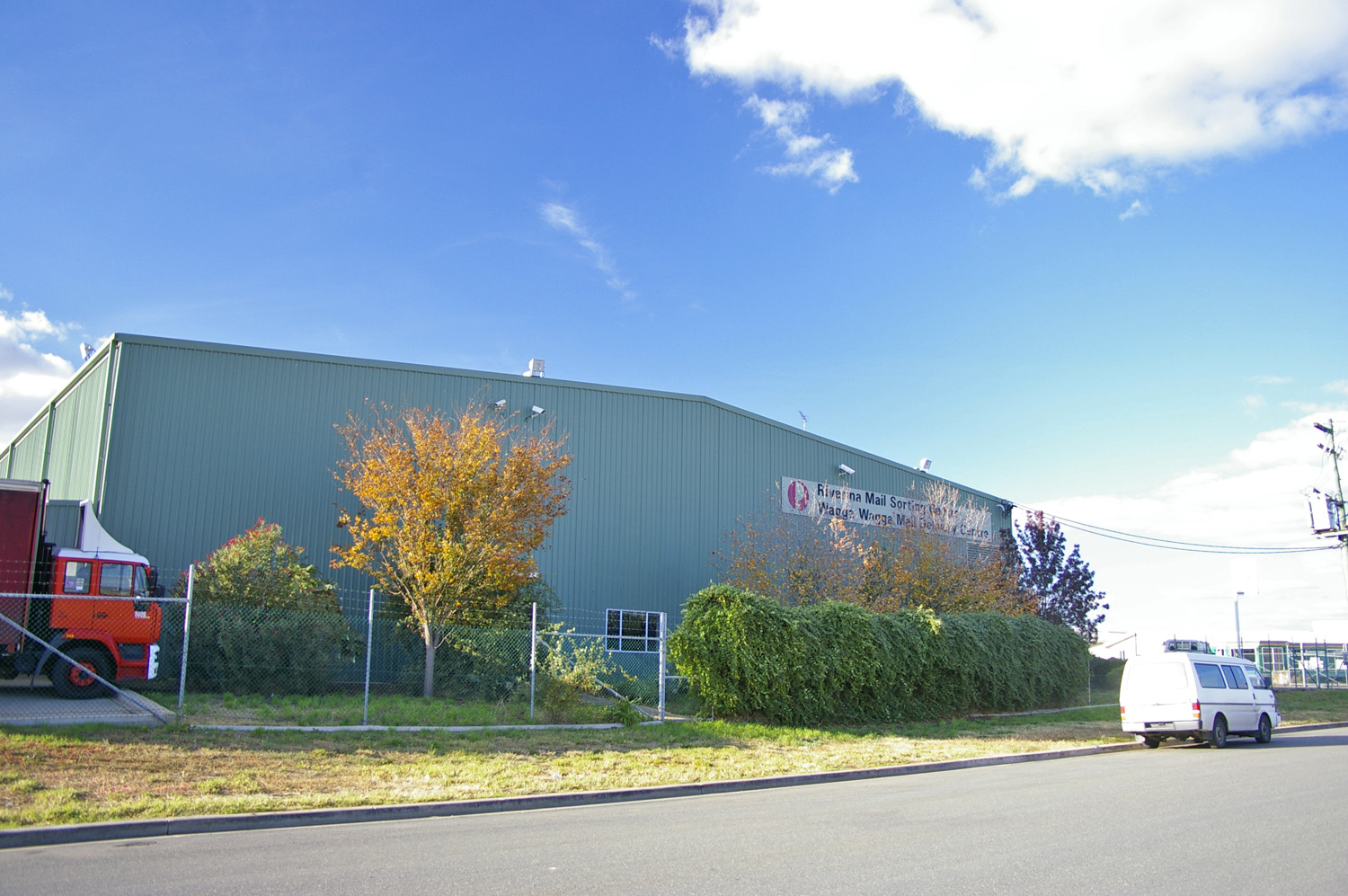
Riverina Mail sorting centre in Wagga Wagga, New South Wales

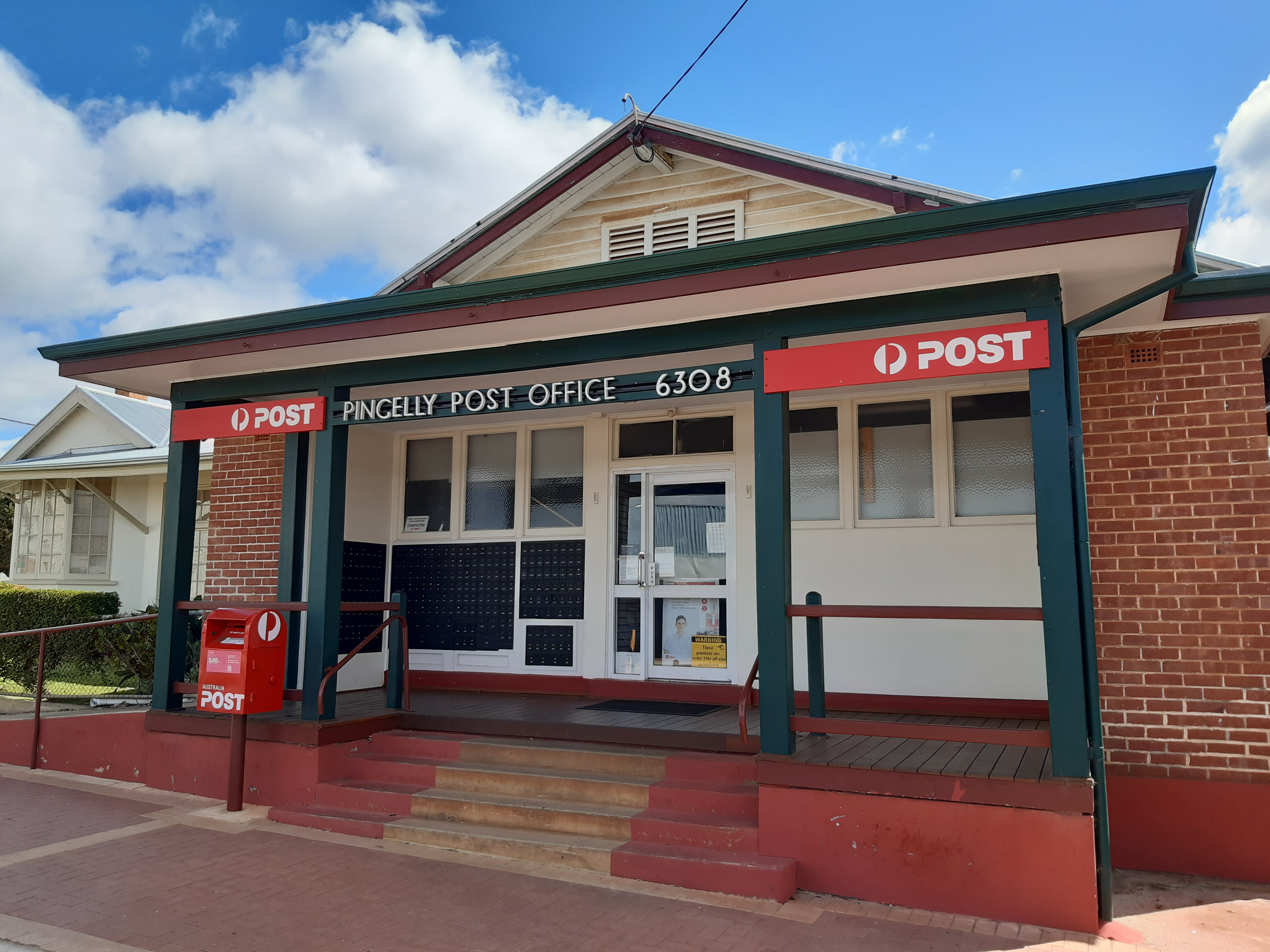
A rural post office in Pingelly, Western Australia

== Organisational structure and information ==
=== Board of directors ===
- Siobhan McKenna (chair)
- Andrea Staines (deputy chair)
- Paul Graham (group chief executive officer and managing director)
- Robyn Clubb (director)
- Richard Dammery (director)
- Laura Inman (director)
- Annastacia Palaszczuk (director)
- Deidre Willmott (director)

=== Employment ===
Empty cells have no data available for that year. All results as at 30 June of the year indicated.

Year	Full-time staff	Part-time staff	Other staff	Ref.
1993	31934	3999		
1994	31130	4204	5626	
1995	31621	4501	5253	
1996	32040	5689	7849	
1997	31111	6185	8466	
1998	29564	6961	9151	
1999	28205	6756	9776	
2000	26915	8482	9455	
2001	27079	8458	9660	
2002	26950	8812	9703	
2003	26394	9033	9557	
2004	26019	9030	9559	
2005	25851	8953	9570	
2006	25387	9196	6415	
2007	25026	9498	6247	
2008	25093	9936		
2009	25149	10360	8106	
2010	24205	10252		
2011	23369	10103		
2012	23221	9810		
2013	23526	8938		
2014	27315	8613		
2015	27098	8195		
2019	27785	7316		

==== Job cuts ====
In June 2015, Australia Post announced that in view of mounting losses, and especially the accelerating decline in its letter delivery service, it would reduce its workforce by 1,900 over three years through voluntary redundancies. At the time, mail delivery losses were approaching A$500 million for the 2014–15 financial year. As of 2019 however, Australia Post's workforce was broadly similar in numbers compared to 2015.

== Facts and statistics ==
Nationwide there are 7,950 postal routes serviced by 10,000 postal delivery workers, colloquially called posties. Motorcycles (including the Honda CT110) are used for delivery on about 6,600 routes, bicycles on 350 routes and walking for 1,000 routes. Electric-assisted bicycles were introduced in Victoria in 2011. Cars, trucks and vans are used on only the longest routes. Until the 1960s, the longest overland mail route in the world was Meekatharra to Marble Bar, Western Australia. As there were few roads, a return journey took seven days. The current longest overland route is Norseman, Western Australia to Border Village, South Australia, a distance of 1,460 km (910 mi). The longest air service delivers to remote communities in the outback covering 1,790 km (1,110 mi) over two days. The last remaining mailboat service still operates on the Hawkesbury River to the north of Sydney, out of Brooklyn, and is called Riverboat Postman.

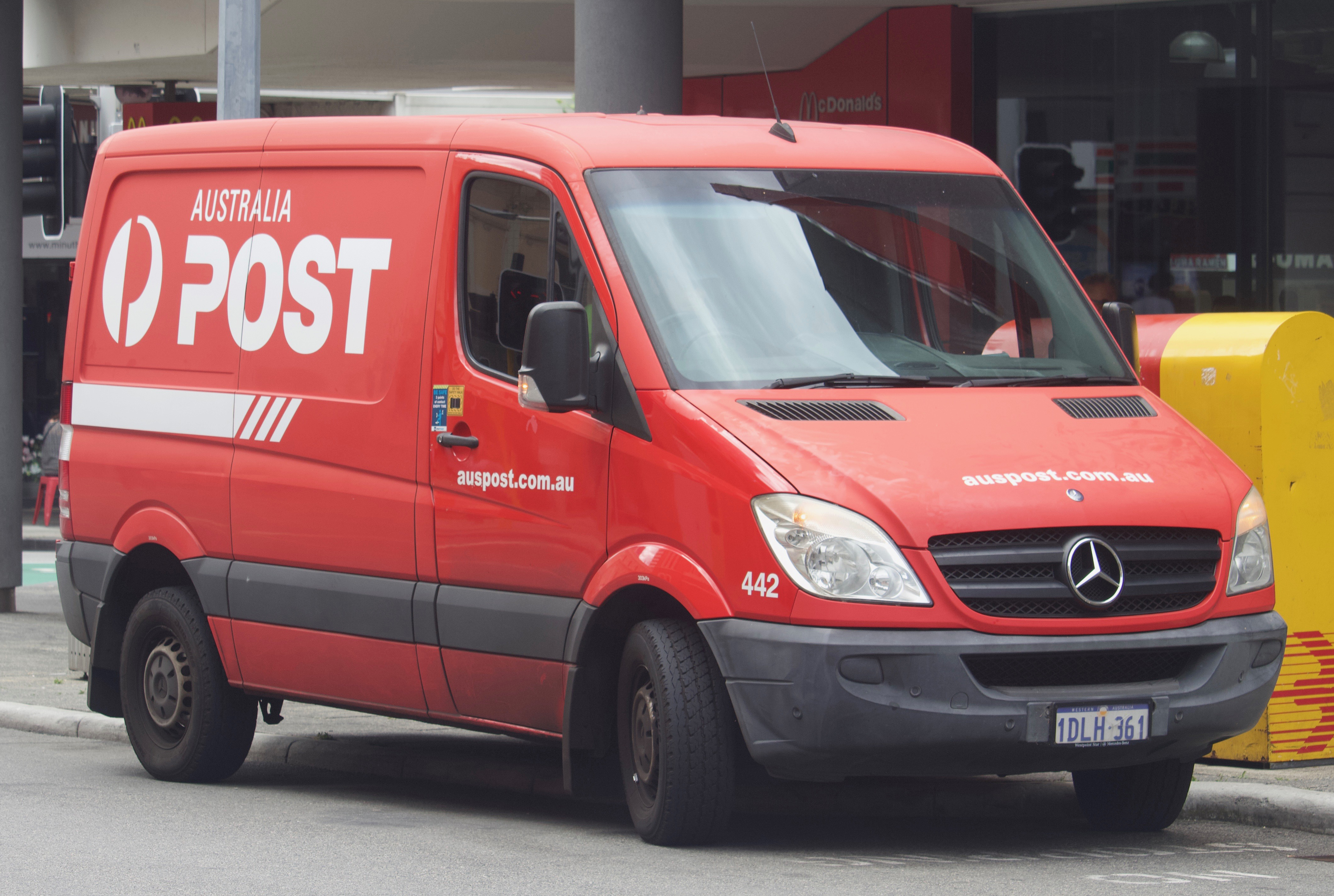
An Australia Post van

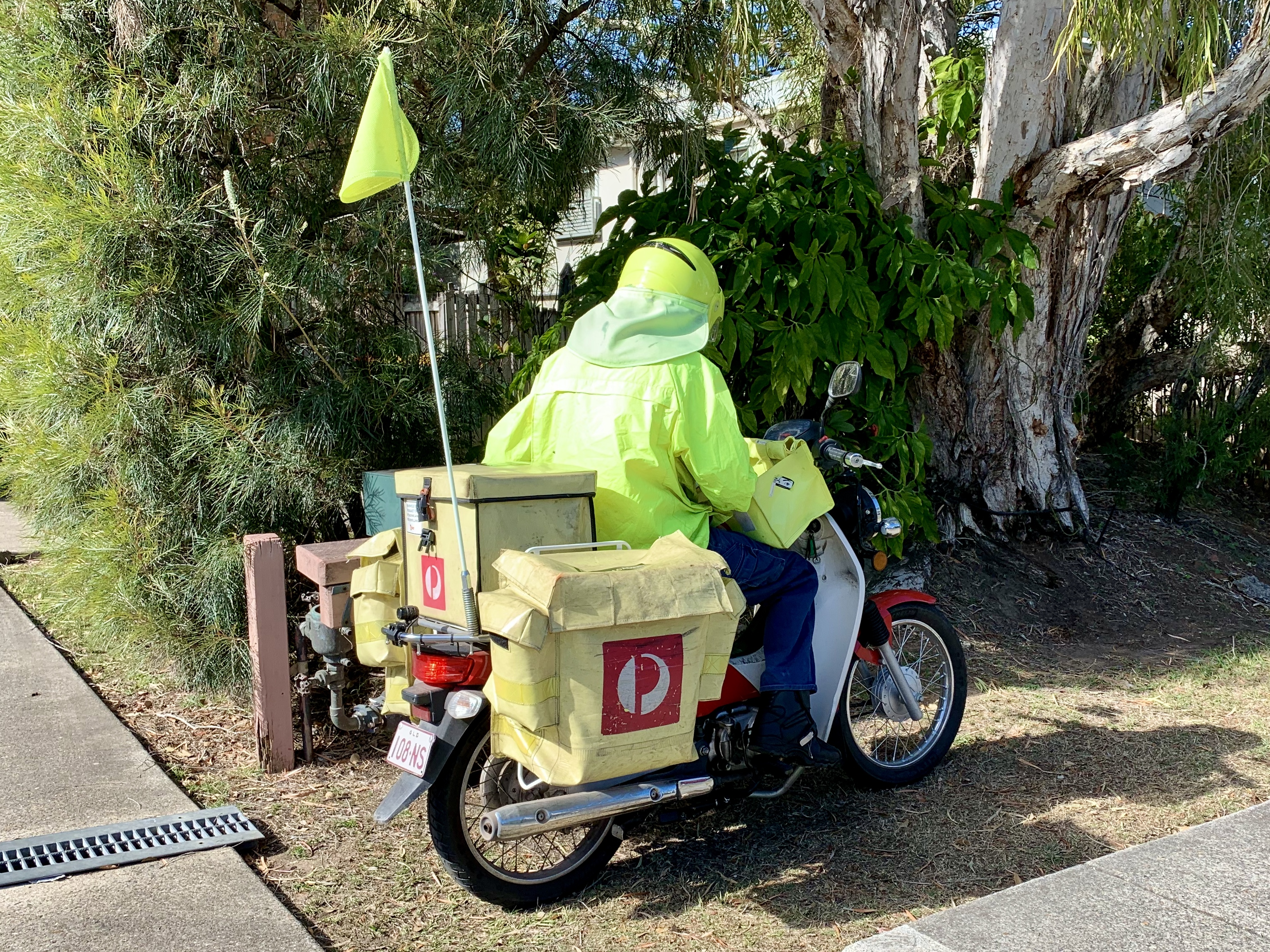
A postperson delivering mail on a motor bike

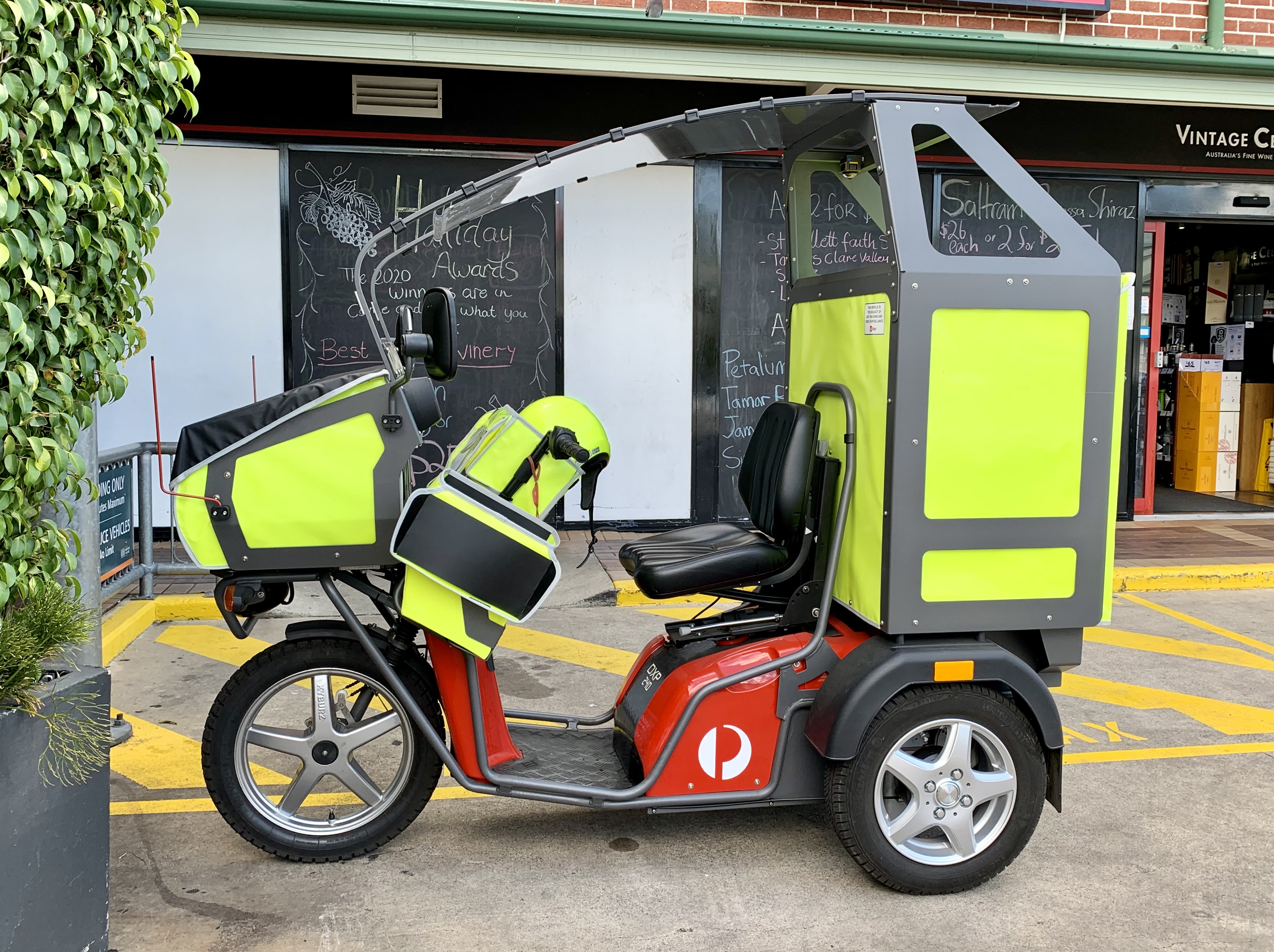
Electric scooters have been introduced in more recent years

The most isolated Post Office is located 217 km (135 mi) from Onslow, Western Australia, 32 km (20 mi) from the nearest customer. The highest Post Office is located in Perisher Ski Resort at 1,720 metres (5,640 ft) above sea level.

According to the 2019 annual report, Australia Post:

- delivered 40 million parcels in December (a new record);
- generated revenue of A$6.99 billion, equivalent to A$7.73 billion in 2022;
- earned profit (before tax) of A$41.1 million;
- saved over A$250 million (business efficiency savings);
- obtained complete ownership of Australia Post Global (APG);
- domestic parcel growth reached a revenue of up to 9.2%;
- still owns StarTrack;
- delivers to 214 countries

and had:

- over 4,342 post offices, over 2,529 in rural and remote areas
- over 15,037 street posting boxes
- approximately 80,000 people in the workforce

Undelivered items go to the mail redistribution centres, which attempt to return the items to their senders.

In February 2015, Australia Post reported a 56% fall in its half-year profit from 2014, a loss of A$151 million. The first full-year loss in over 30 years was forecast. Managing director, Ahmed Fahour noted this tied in with a worldwide decline of letter volumes over the past seven years.

In February 2017, it was reported Fahour's reforms reduced potential 2015-16 losses, to A$138 million.

== Products and services ==
Australia Post operates in three core markets: letters and associated services; agency services and retail merchandise; and parcels and logistics that span both domestic and international markets.

=== Letters and associated services ===
Australia Post collects, processes and distributes letters for the entire Australian community and between Australia and other countries overseas. It also offers bulk mail delivery services for businesses and community organisations and provides research, advice, consumer list rental, and profiling and segmentation services to help businesses target their objectives and customers, along with other associated services.

==== Postal services ====
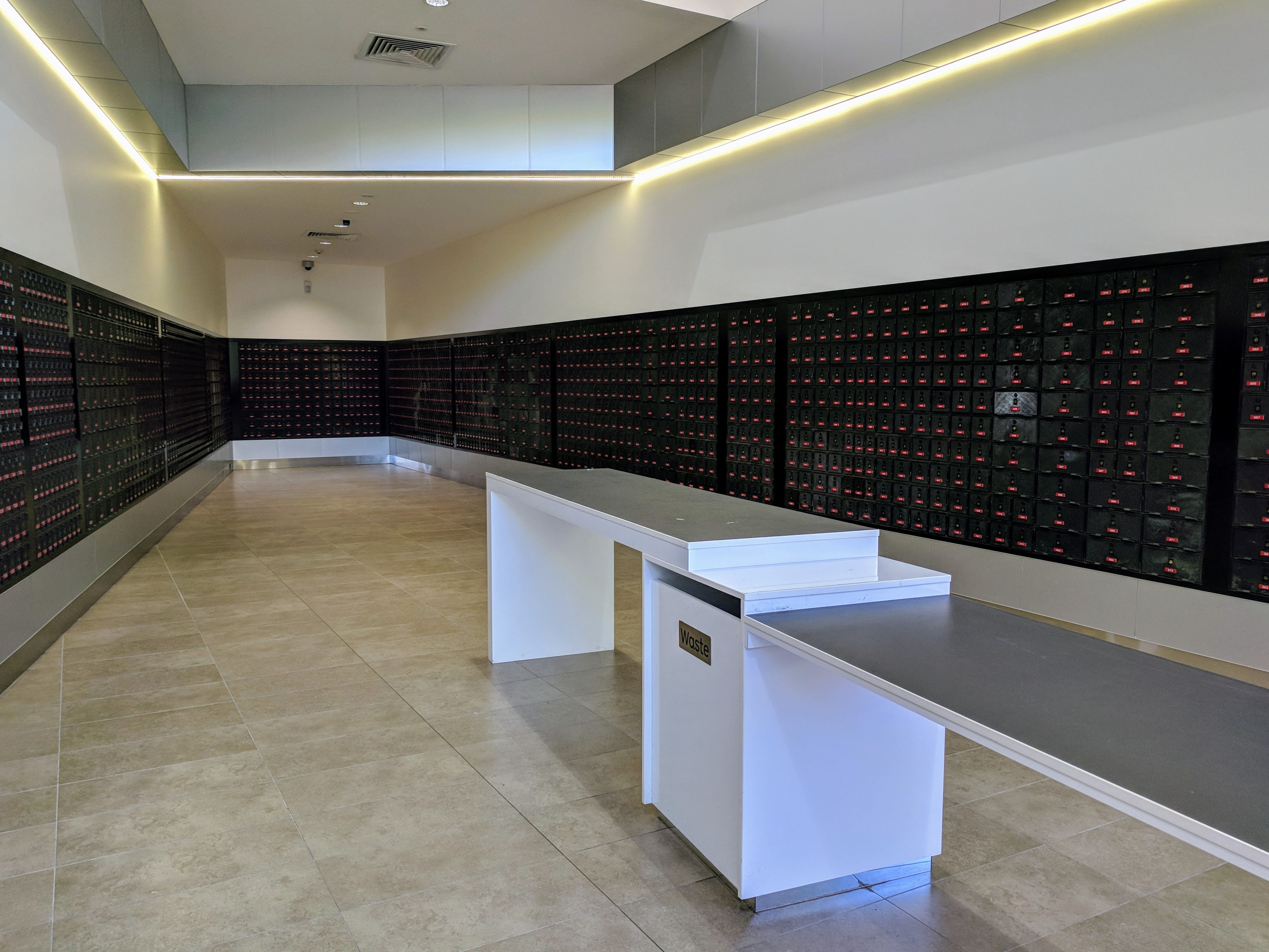
Post boxes at the Canberra GPO in 2018

While postal services of letters and parcels are one of the original areas of Australia Post, it has also diversified its operations into the provision of other services including agency services, business-to-business integration and logistics and supply chain management.

==== Postage rate ====
===== Basic domestic =====
The basic postage rate for a small letter has increased over the years due to inflation but influenced in recent years by a complex interplay between Australia Post's monopoly over small items, and need to provide service to all Australian addresses at the mandated basic rate.

In July 2009, Australia Post requested the Australian Competition & Consumer Commission (ACCC) to approve a stamp price rise in 2010 to A$0.60 but the ACCC declined the approval of the price rise. However in April 2010, Australia Post resubmitted the proposed postal stamp rise. The ACCC approved this request on 28 May 2010 and it was published in the Government Gazette on 9 June 2010.

On 26 December 2013, due to the heavy decline in mail usage due to competition (such as email), Australia Post requested an increase in the base rate to A$0.70.

On 4 January 2016, due to continuing heavy decline in mail usage, Australia Post requested an increase in the base rate to A$1.00.

As of 1 February 2020, the base rate for domestic letters was A$1.10.

- 1911: 1d equivalent to A$0.64 in 2022
- 1920: 2d equivalent to A$0.79 in 2022
- 1950: 3d equivalent to A$0.58 in 2022
- 1959: 5d equivalent to A$0.69 in 2022
- 1966: A$0.04, equivalent to A$0.59 in 2022 (Australian dollar replaced Australian pound on 14 February 1966)
- 1967: A$0.05, equivalent to A$0.71 in 2022
- 1970: A$0.06, equivalent to A$0.78 in 2022
- 1971: A$0.07, equivalent to A$0.86 in 2022
- 1974: A$0.10, equivalent to A$0.92 in 2022
- 1975: A$0.18, equivalent to A$1.44 in 2022
- 1978: A$0.20, equivalent to A$1.16 in 2022
- 1980: A$0.22, equivalent to A$1.06 in 2022
- 1981: A$0.24, equivalent to A$1.06 in 2022
- 1982: A$0.27, equivalent to A$1.07 in 2022
- 1983: A$0.30, equivalent to A$1.08 in 2022
- 1985: A$0.33, equivalent to A$1.07 in 2022
- 1986: A$0.36, equivalent to A$1.07 in 2022
- 1987: A$0.37, equivalent to A$1.01 in 2022
- 1988: A$0.39, equivalent to A$1 in 2022
- 1989: A$0.41, equivalent to A$0.98 in 2022
- 1990: A$0.43 equivalent to A$0.95 in 2022 (effective 3 September 1990)
- 1992: A$0.45 equivalent to A$0.96 in 2022 (effective 2 January 1992)
- 2000: A$0.45 equivalent to A$0.8 in 2022 (effective 1 July 2000). With the introduction of the GST, the postage component was decreased to absorb the new GST cost, so for the public there was no change in stamp prices. For businesses the GST claimable component of the postage rate was 4¢, leaving a reduced cost to business users of just 41¢.
- 2003: A$0.50 equivalent to A$0.81 in 2022 (effective 13 January 2003)
- 2008: A$0.55 equivalent to A$0.76 in 2022 (effective 1 September 2008)
- 2010: A$0.60 equivalent to A$0.79 in 2022 (effective 28 June 2010)
- 2014: A$0.70 equivalent to A$0.84 in 2022 (effective 31 March 2014)
- 2016: A$1.00 equivalent to A$1.17 in 2022 (effective 4 January 2016)
- 2020: A$1.10 equivalent to A$1.21 in 2022 (effective 1 February 2020)
- 2023: A$1.20 (effective 1 January 2023)
- 2024: A$1.50 (effective 3 April 2024)
- 2025: A$1.70 (effective 17 July 2025)

===== Large letters =====
Since about 2005, larger letters have been charged a round multiple of the base postage rate, which is helpful to customers if they do not have stocks of the more expensive stamps.

- 260 mm × 360 mm × 20 mm (10.24 in × 14.17 in × 0.79 in) – Up to 125 g (4.4 oz) – A$2.40
- 260 mm × 360 mm × 20 mm (10.24 in × 14.17 in × 0.79 in) – Up to 250 g (8.8 oz) – A$3.60
- 260 mm × 360 mm × 20 mm (10.24 in × 14.17 in × 0.79 in) – Up to 500 g (18 oz) – A$6.00

A large letter, including packaging, cannot be more than 20 mm (0.79 in) thick or larger than 260 mm × 360 mm (10 in × 14 in), otherwise it will be considered a parcel, which as of July 2023 costs a minimum of A$10.60 for up to 500 g (18 oz).

=== Agency services and retail merchandise ===
Agency services: Australia Post provides third-party agency services that connect consumers, businesses and government bodies such as bill payment services, banking services and identity services. Australia Post also offers personal finance products, such as car and travel insurance and currency conversion.

Retail Merchandise: A variety of complementary products, packaging products, collectibles and post office boxes and locked bags are offered across the network of Australia Post outlets in Australia.

Australia Post is one of organisations of issuing agency of Australian Passport along with Australian Passport Office of Australian Department of Foreign Affairs and Trade.

=== Parcels and logistics ===
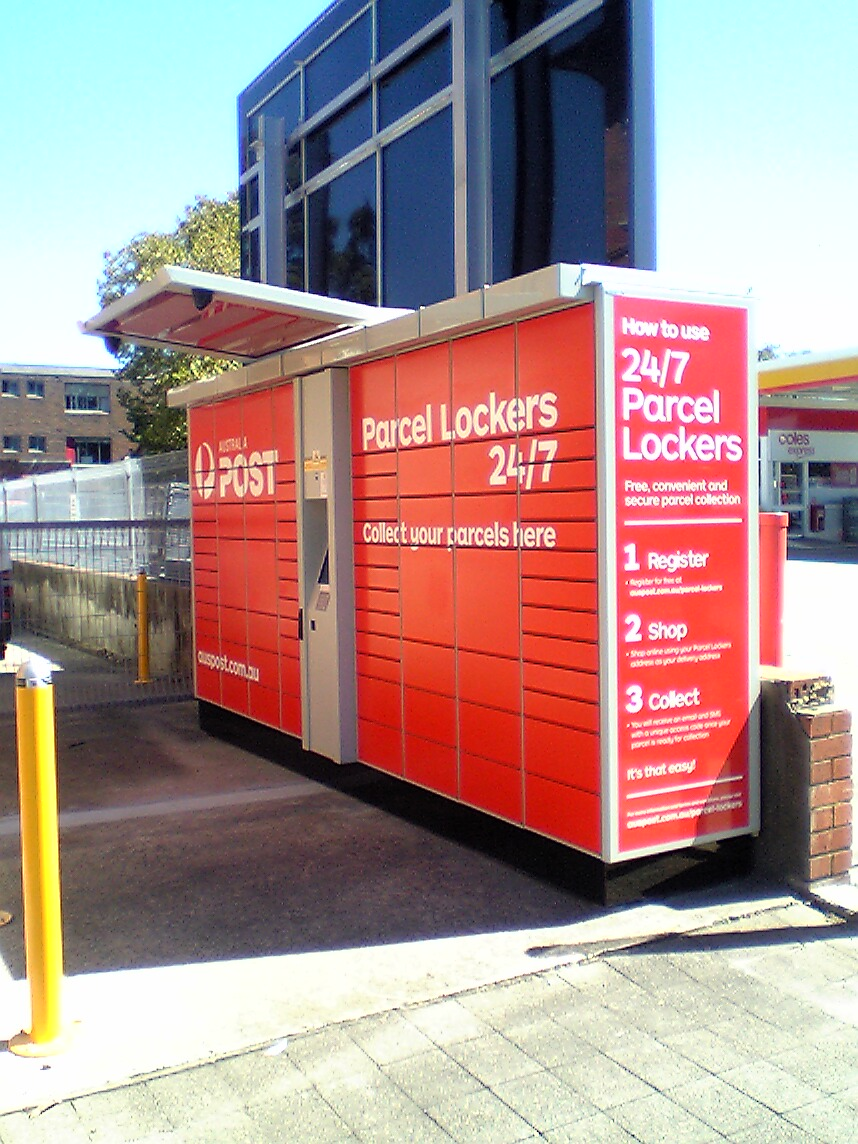
Australia Post postal lockers located next to the Annandale Post Office. Customers can retrieve parcels 24 hours a day with a PIN.

Australia Post collects, processes and delivers single parcels or multi-parcel consignments all across Australia and internationally. It also provides end-to-end supply chain capabilities, from manufacturer (domestic or international) to consumer with integrated logistics services and a broad range of distribution options to track and trace deliveries.

=== Digital services ===
Australia Post offers a number of digital services outside of their main mail/parcel/logistics area. These include employment screening, online payment services and a digital identity platform.

=== Parcel lockers ===
Australia Post started offering parcel lockers in 2012, which has now expanded to over 700 locations near post offices, supermarkets and railway stations. These lockers are free to use for Australia Post deliveries, and deliveries to a locker may be collected at any time, day and night, within 48 hours of delivery.

Parcel lockers are also available to use for sending prepaid parcels under 16 kilograms (35 lb), with tracking details updated as soon as you have dropped your parcel off.

=== Vending machines ===
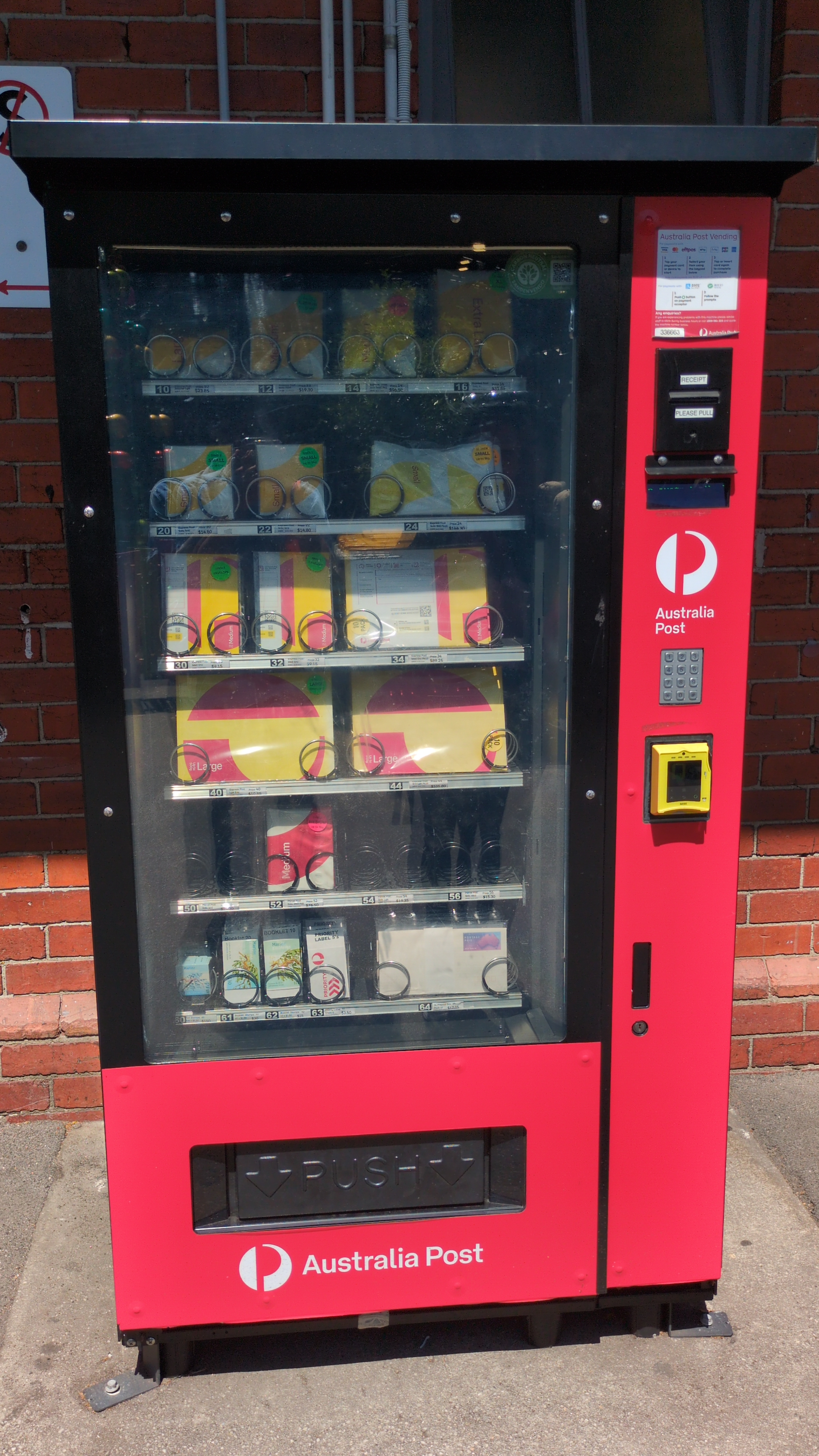
An Australia Post vending machine at the Queen Victoria Market selling satchels, envelopes, and stamps

Australia Post provides 24/7 vending machines which sells postal items such as satchels, stamps, and envelopes.

=== StarTrack ===
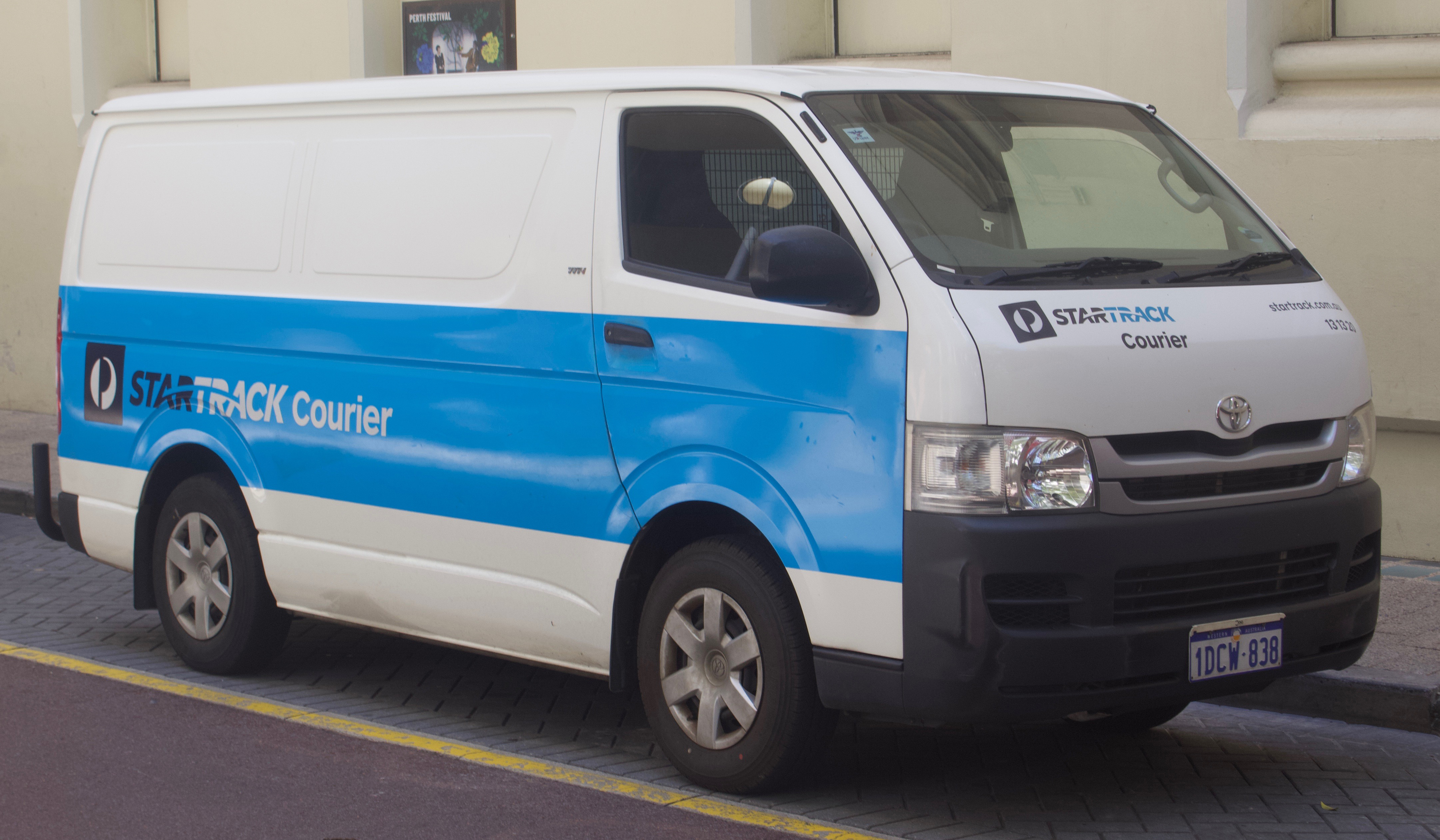
A Toyota HiAce with StarTrack Courier Van lettering

On 23 December 2003, Australia Post and Qantas went into a joint venture to acquire StarTrack from the company's founder, Greg Poche.

On 18 May 2011, it was announced the merger of the retail division of Australian airExpress (AaE) with StarTrack. StarTrack will be a solely retail-focused business and AaE will focus solely on domestic air linehaul and cargo terminal operations. The changes follow a review of the businesses guided by AUX Investments, a company established in 2010, to guide the review and provide streamlined governance across the businesses.

In November 2012, Australia Post bought the 50% of the company owned by Qantas. As part of the deal, Australia Post divested itself of its 50% interest in Australian airExpress to Qantas.

On 7 May 2014, StarTrack was rebranded to include Australia Post Post horn in the StarTrack blue colours. StarTrack also took responsibility of Australia Post's "Messenger Post couriers" under the StarTrack brand as "StarTrack Courier".

== Letterboxes ==
Letter boxes for houses and units are mostly standard items bought from hardware stores.

Letterboxes for farms and sparsely located rural houses are often made from 200-litre (53 US gal) or smaller barrels. Such boxes were formerly numbered using the Rural Mail Box system, but they are now numbered according to distance travelled on a main road. For example, if your property's letter box is located 10.52 kilometres (6.54 mi) from the start of the main road, your letter box number is 1052. Rural letter boxes are located on the road and not the farm.

== Criticism and controversies ==
Australia Post has had a long and difficult relationship with the Communication Workers Union. In 2012, the union claimed that delivery contractors provided a poor parcel delivery service, especially during the peak Christmas period. Alleged shortcomings included a propensity to insert "delivery failure" cards into mailboxes rather than attempting delivery of packages, thus requiring the customer to travel to a post office to collect items personally.

Complaints by individuals and the LPO Group about Australia Post's business practices in relation to its franchised retail outlets – Licensed Post Offices (LPOs) and Community Postal Agencies – resulted in the Australian Senate conducting an inquiry in 2014. The inquiry's unanimous report included recommendations for increased payments and the establishment of an independently chaired stakeholder forum.

In May 2015, Australia Post had a legal battle with Sendle, a transnational courier using the slogan post without the office. Australia Post claimed that the term was deceptively similar to their trademark and what they stand for. Sendle argued that there was no similarity and that in fact, they were differentiating from Australia Post. Two years were spent in the trademark dispute, which resulted in Sendle winning the case.

=== 2020 watch controversy ===
On 2 November 2020, the CEO Christine Holgate announced her resignation, due to increasing pressure from the Prime Minister Scott Morrison and Communications Minister Paul Fletcher to investigate further into the gifting of four senior executives with the total of A$20,000, equivalent to A$21,929 in 2022, worth of Cartier watches. The watches were initially reported as A$3,000 each, tallying A$12,000 on purchase. Holgate argued that she did not regret the purchase, as its purpose was to "drive positive change" and "thank and reward positive behaviours". Increasing media attention also contributed to her decision, as it was causing much "debate and distraction" and was negatively impacting her health. She retorted, "I appreciate the optics of the gifts involved do not pass the 'pub test' for many".

The reward was reportedly to tip the four senior executives who secured a deal in 2018, which allowed the customers of Commonwealth Bank, National Australia Bank and Westpac to do their banking at the post office.

During a senate estimates hearing on 22 October 2020, Holgate defended her decision, saying "We are a commercial organisation, it was a recommendation from our chair that these people get rewarded". (Australia Post is owned by the Australian Government, but is commercialised through corporatisation, and does not receive funding from the government.)

== See also ==
- Australia Post stamps and products
- House numbering
- List of national postal services
- Mail
- Postage stamps and postal history of Australia
- Section 51(v) of the Constitution of Australia, the section that covers postal services
