= EarthStation 5 =

Peer-to-peer network active between 2003 and 2005

Earth Station 5

- Screenshot of the EarthStation 5 website at the time of launch
- Developer: Earth Station 5
- Release: 2003-06-09
- Operating system: Windows
- Type: Peer-to-peer file sharing
- License: Proprietary

Earth Station 5 (ES5) was a peer-to-peer network active between 2003 and 2005, operated by a company of the same name. The user client application also shared this name. Earth Station 5 was notable for its strong, if overstated, emphasis on user anonymity, and for its bold advocacy of piracy and copyright infringement. ES5's highly antagonistic position toward copyright advocacy and enforcement organizations garnered the group significant attention and peaked with an ES5 press release announcing a "declaration of war" against the Motion Picture Association of America. ES5 claimed to operate out of the Jenin in the Palestinian Authority-controlled West Bank, a region where they argued that copyright laws were unenforceable. Investigative journalism cast serious doubts on the company's Palestinian origin as well as many of its other claims. To this day, much about the company and its leadership remains uncertain or unknown.

== Peer-to-peer services ==
Earth Station 5 was based around a peer-to-peer (P2P) file sharing service and a standalone Earth Station 5 file-sharing client. Initial versions of the software could only share or download files by using the ES5 network.

ES5's P2P network and client were announced on June 9, 2003. People associated with ES5 claimed in media reports that the network had more than 16,000,000 participants at its peak, but these numbers were unsupported and viewed very skeptically. The actual number of participants was probably several orders of magnitude smaller.

Largely due to the low availability of files on the small ES5 network, later versions of the ES5 client included the free software/open source giFT daemon which provided ES5 users access to the larger Gnutella and FastTrack networks. While Gnutella and FastTrack offered access to many more files, the functionality that let users access these networks did not take advantage of any of ES5's anonymity features, which decreased the advantages of ES5 over other P2P clients — in particular other FastTrack or Gnutella clients.

=== ES5 software ===
Screenshot showcasing other services they offered.

The first version of the ES5 client used a space and spaceship motif and provided many options. In addition to several filesharing options, it provided links to chat, news, forums, dating functionality and news. The client interface was derided by reviewers as "clunky" and "a busy affair" for its plethora of features.

The second version of the client, released a year later, garnered better reviews. However, users still felt overwhelmed by the "bundled" features that included a dating service and audio-visual chat. ES5 claimed it planned to capitalize on these features in order to become profitable.

=== Claims to anonymity ===
ES5 became well known for its strong claims that file-sharing on its network was entirely anonymous — a feature it billed as its most important and revolutionary — and that its users could share files while remaining undetectable and thus invulnerable to lawsuits by the RIAA's member companies, which had recently begun suing P2P users. ES5 president Ras Kabir claimed that on ES5, "users no longer have to be concerned about what they are sharing, or with whom they are sharing because there is complete anonymity."

Many groups countered ES5's claims about its users' anonymity. RIAA vice president Matt Oppenheim described it as "marketing hype of the worst kind. It is playing on the fears of others, encouraging them to engage in behavior that will get them into a boatload of trouble." Even many participating in or sympathetic to the file-sharing community were skeptical, believing that anonymous communication on P2P networks was technically impossible without critically compromising quality of service, and as a result they considered ES5's claims to be snake oil.

ES5's claims to anonymity were based on its use of several security technologies. The first version of the software used Secure Sockets Layer (SSL) encryption, encrypted searches over UDP, and integration with PGPDisk. However, none of these layers of security prevented RIAA member companies from detecting and gathering information about ES5 users' file trading activities. In later versions of its client, ES5 added the ability to use a network of proxies to obscure the source of requests or shared files. ES5 staffers maintained a frequently-updated list of proxy servers. List updates were posted regularly to the ES5 forums and then updated into the clients by hand. ES5 also added the ability to "spoof" IP addresses in a way that ES5 claimed made it more difficult to track down file sharers. While ES5's claim to anonymity continued to be viewed skeptically by both P2P advocates and RIAA representatives, no ES5 users were ever sued by the RIAA.

=== Copyright infringement by ES5 ===
After the ruling in A&M Records, Inc. v. Napster, Inc., which held Napster liable for contributory infringement by its users, most P2P networks were careful to adopt a strategy of "turning a blind eye" to copyright infringement on their network in order to escape or minimize liability. ES5 distinguished itself by openly supporting its users' copyright infringement over its network and by actively participating in sharing movies with its users.

Some within the file-sharing community speculated that ES5 shared media in order to "seed" the network with media — a step necessary because ES5's user base was very small compared to other networks and it did not require quotas. ES5 shared media by downloading content from other networks (e.g., Kazaa and Gnutella), vetting these for quality, and then connecting a version of their client to their network from one of their servers. This step was important in assuring that ES5's network could offer a sufficient amount of content to users.

In the early stages of the network, ES5 tried to attract users by streaming movies in addition to in-network sharing. To do this, ES5 created a website at es5.org which provided links to dozens of Hollywood films immediately available for streaming.

== Antagonistic relationship to media industry ==
While few P2P networks enjoy friendly relationships with the media and content industries, ES5 displayed a famously antagonistic relationship to them—most notably the US-based Motion Picture Association of America and Recording Industry Association of America. This position culminated in a famous press release where ES5 formally declared war on the MPAA:

In response to the email received today from the Motion Picture Association of America (MPAA) to Earthstation 5 for copyright violations for streaming FIRST RUN movies over the internet for FREE, this is our official response!
Earthstation 5 is at war with the Motion Picture Association of America (MPAA) and the Record Association of America (RIAA), and to make our point very clear that their governing laws and policys [sic] have absolutely no meaning to us here in Palestine, we will continue to add even more movies for FREE.

In the same release, ES5 claimed that, "unlike Kazaa and other P2P programs who subsequently deny building their P2P program for illegal file-sharing, ES5 is the only P2P application and portal to actually join its users in doing P2P."

Because of its antagonistic relationship to media companies, its highly outspoken stance, and its claims to be based in a refugee camp in the West Bank, ES5 became the center of a large amount of media attention. Investigative articles ultimately served to expose much of the lies and misinformation behind the site and its operators.

== People and leadership ==
ES5 intentionally obscured the details of its company leadership. While ES5 claimed that it had over one thousand employees (most based in the West Bank), the facts seem to indicate that there were never more than a handful.

Publicly, ES5 was run by President Ras Kabir, Lead Programmer "File Hoover", and Forums Administrator and Programmer "SharePro". Faced with evidence that the company had a relationship with Stephen M. Cohen, then a fugitive because of his involvement in the sex.com scandal, the company announced its retention of Cohen's services as an executive consultant.

=== Ras Kabir ===
Most ES5 press releases quoted company president Ras Kabir who, like most of the company, was nominally based in Jenin in the West Bank.

=== Stephen M. Cohen ===
While his involvement in the project was publicly hidden early on, Stephen Michael Cohen was closely involved in all stages of ES5 and, in most opinions, was the founder, primary architect, and primary participant in most of its actions. Cohen is best known as the person involved in fraudulently obtaining control of the sex.com domain name.

ES5's business registrations papers, filed with the Palestinian Authority, listed Cohen as the "sole director" of ES5. Both in the forum and through their spokesperson, ES5 officials claimed that Cohen played the role of a consultant. Kabir claimed that, "We offered Mr. Cohen an executive job with our company. He initially turned us down, however after several telephone calls, he finally gave in and agreed to help us in the capacity of a consultant."

Fueling speculation about Cohen's close involvement, ES5's unanticipated closing coincided closely with Cohen's arrest for activity related to sex.com.

== Downfall ==
ES5 suffered a precipitous downfall that ultimately ended with the closing of the network in 2005. Analysts have seen several factors as contributing to its downfall and ultimate closing.

=== Accusations of Malicious code ===
In September 2003, Shaun "Random Nut" Garriok posted an email message to the Full Disclosure email list claiming to have uncovered "malicious code" in the ES5 client. By sending a specially-formed request, a remote user could use a facility of the ES5 client in order to delete arbitrary files on the computer of anybody running the ES5 client. Garriok concluded that "the people behind ES5 have intentionally added malicious code to ES5" and speculated that:

They could be working for the RIAA, MPAA, or a similar organization. Once they have enough users on their ES5 network, they would start deleting all copyrighted files they own which their users are sharing. The users wouldn't know what hit them.

ES5 representatives replied and suggested that this ability was an unintended side effect of the program's automatic upgrade functionality and patched it through a software update soon after Garriok's revelation. While there no public evidence of collusion between ES5 and the MPAA or RIAA, speculation about it dogged ES5, sowing seeds of distrust.

=== Untrue claims exposed ===
The anonymous authors claimed they were based in a refugee camp in Jenin, though some investigative attempts to locate their headquarters in Jenin were fruitless.

Many of the claims behind ES5 were unsubstantiated and untrue. With increased media analysis, especially from The Washington Post, it became clear that ES5 was not what it claimed to be. ES5 was not based in Jenin or even elsewhere in Palestine. Most of the people claimed to be behind ES5 were found to be fabricated, and many of ES5's technical claims were debunked; also, ES5 was not nearly as large as it claimed at several points.

ES5 had claimed that the encryption around its system made identifying and blocking traffic from the site impossible. A P2P Watch Dog post demonstrated a method by which packets from ES5 could be identified and blocked. This was quickly put into action in several anti-P2P systems on the market at the time.

=== Other contributing factors ===
There were several other reasons that many in the P2P and file-sharing community distrusted ES5. Many speculated that the project was engaging in practices such as seeding and streaming of films from ES5 servers and proxying that would not scale.

But as the apparently secretive and untruthful acts of ES5 came to light, the core fan base began to rebel in the main ES5 forum, leading to many users being banned and topics being deleted. Eventually, the forum collapsed and a new forum was started by the admin "SharePro." The new forum never gained the popularity that the old one had.

=== Closing ===
In February 2005, ES5 quietly closed its doors. On January 24, 2005, Stephen Cohen posted a strange message on the ES5 forums asking users to work with him to reinvent the platform:

After spending hours and hours with the programmers, I have decided to SCRAP the ES5 software and start all over again. This board in the meantime will remain open to everyone. Anyone interested in a SUPER NOVA type thing? Anyone else have any good opinions on what we should do? Who wants to help?

Within a month, ES5 was completely shut down and dismantled. The ES5 website and forums were taken offline permanently and are today only accessible through the Internet Archive's Wayback Machine.
