= Casino.com =

Online gambling domain and website

- Website type: Online casino (2003–2023); gambling affiliate site (2023–present)
- Available in: Multiple
- Owner: Mansion Group (2003–2023)
- Website: www.casino.com
- Commercial: Yes
- Launched: 2003; 23 years ago (under Mansion Group)
- Current status: Active

Casino.com is a gambling website. From 2003 to 2023 the domain hosted a real-money online casino operated by the Gibraltar-based Mansion Group. Since 2023 it has operated as an affiliate website that reviews and compares third-party online casinos. The domain was sold for US$5.5 million in 2003 and is often listed among the most expensive domain-name sales.

== History ==
The domain first went online at least in 2000 per the book review by Scott Western ''Gambling on the Internet''. It was a casino news portal owned by Boss Media, a Swedish gambling-software company.

In 2003 the domain was sold to Mansion Group, a gambling operator founded and licensed in Gibraltar that year, for US$5.5 million. The sale was listed among the largest publicly reported domain-name transactions and among the highest recorded in the gambling sector. Mansion operated Casino.com as a real-money online casino serving mainly players in the United Kingdom and continental Europe, alongside its sister brand MansionCasino.com. The casino used software from providers including Microgaming and Playtech and was licensed in Gibraltar. It received a casino licence from the Great Britain Gambling Commission in November 2017.

In August 2011, Mansion Group signed a two-year commercial partnership with Premier League club Manchester City FC, becoming the club's Official International Betting Partner.

In November 2013 the Dutch gambling regulator, the Kansspelautoriteit, issued a €150,000 penalty jointly on Onisac Limited, the operator of Casino.com, and its parent company Mansion Online Casino Limited, for not correct licensing and operating in the Netherlands between September 2012 and April 2013.

In 2018, Mansion received the "Most Responsible Online Gambling Operator, Global" award from Capital Finance International and the "Online Casino Operator of the Year" award at the International Gaming Awards.

In January 2020, Casino.com launched its dedicated live casino studio in collaboration with the gaming technology provider Playtech. In September 2022, the website entered into a strategic partnership with the high-end London casino Les Ambassadeurs Club, to launch of a co-branded online live casino offering "Les A Privé".

In January 2023, Mansion closed its UK-facing casino brands. The affected sites stopped accepting deposits and ended gameplay on 12 January 2023. In October 2023 Mansion informed affiliates and media partners that it was closing all business-to-consumer operations of Casino.com and MansionCasino.com, ending real-money gaming on 26 October 2023.

Mansion described the change as a transition from casino operator to affiliate review platform, while trade press reported it as the closure of the company's consumer casino business.

Since 2023, Casino.com operated as an online-casino comparison and review website. It does not offer real-money gambling directly, instead publishing reviews of third-party casinos and referring visitors to licensed operators in return for commission through affiliate links. The company works with more than 200 casino partners across more than 30 countries.

== See also ==
- Online gambling
- Affiliate marketing
- List of most expensive domain names
