= Spruce Finance =

American consumer finance company

Spruce Finance (US)
- Company type: Private
- Industry: Solar electricity funding
- Founded: 2015; 11 years ago
- Headquarters: San Francisco, United States
- Area served: United States
- Key people: Nat Kreamer (CEO); Jeff Loebbaka; Steve Olszewski; Nick Mack; Leslie Cariani; Darren Thompson
- Products: Residential solar finance, home improvement finance
- Website: www.sprucefinance.com

Spruce Finance is an American consumer finance company specializing in the residential solar finance and efficiency home improvement sectors in the U.S.

The company operates its efficiency business in 50 states and its solar business in 25 states: Arizona, California, Colorado, Connecticut, Delaware, Florida, Hawaii, Louisiana, Maryland, Massachusetts, Minnesota, Missouri, Nevada, New Mexico, New Hampshire, New Jersey, New York, Oregon, Pennsylvania, Rhode Island, South Carolina, Texas, Utah, Vermont and Washington.

== History ==
The company was founded in 2015 when Clean Power Finance merged with Kilowatt Financial and is led by CEO Nat Kreamer, co-founder of Sunrun.

== Controversies ==
Spruce has bought several leasing contracts from companies that either sold their holdings or went out of business. When this occurs, their customer service is very weak. Billing mistakes, poor communication, and loss of service with the panels is common. Spruce has dozens of complaints with the Better Business Bureau of Houston and is one of the worst reviewed solar energy companies in the market today. They claim that they are in a transition period but this has been going on for over two years now (as of the fall of 2022).

== Investors ==
Spruce is a private company backed by investors that include Kleiner Perkins Caufield & Byers, Google Ventures (GV), Duke Energy (NYSE: DUK), Edison International (NYSE: EIX), Dominion Resources (NYSE: D), and Claremont Creek Ventures.
