= The Oatmeal and FunnyJunk legal dispute =

2011–12 copyright infringement dispute

A legal dispute between webcomic The Oatmeal and content aggregator website FunnyJunk began in 2011. The Oatmeal creator Matthew Inman alleged in 2011 that FunnyJunk users repeatedly infringed copyright of The Oatmeal's original content. In June 2012, FunnyJunk's lawyer, Charles Carreon, sent Inman a letter demanding US$20,000 in damages from him, alleging the claims he made were defamatory. Inman responded by publishing the letter on his site, along with a response and announcement that he would be organizing a charity fundraiser through Indiegogo, donating the amount demanded by Carreon to the American Cancer Society and the National Wildlife Federation.

On June 15, 2012, Carreon filed a separate pro se lawsuit Carreon vs Inman et al against Inman, Indiegogo, both charities and a hundred Does for allegations related to The Oatmeal's response and related actions by other individuals. Carreon dropped this case on July 3 of that year. Mashable named the case first among their list of "silliest tech lawsuits ever." Carreon was also sued by the anonymous operator of a blog parodying him after Carreon sent letters to the site's web host demanding they reveal its operator.

== Background ==
FunnyJunk is a website where users can upload content they find humorous. According to Ars Technica, key FunnyJunk personnel are Bryan Durel and Benjamin Bunker.

In 2010, The Oatmeal creator Matthew Inman found that FunnyJunk was distributing copies of comics from his website without permission. He sent e-mails, resulting in removal of some but not all of the comics, and subsequently discontinued attempts at removal.

In May 2011, Inman made a post on The Oatmeal's blog against FunnyJunk and contemplating a cease and desist under the DMCA (see Online Copyright Infringement Liability Limitation Act). The FunnyJunk owner known simply as "Admin" responded with a message to all users claiming that “the Oatmeal wants to sue funnyjunk and shut it down! He thinks we're nothing more than dirty content thieves...Contact Oatmeal anyway you can!" and provided links to The Oatmeal's e-mail and Facebook page. This triggered spamming by FunnyJunk users and a flame war with The Oatmeal readers.

== Operation BearLove Good, Cancer Bad ==
In 2011/2012, FunnyJunk hired Charles Carreon to review its website. In June 2012, Carreon delivered a demand letter via process server to Matthew Inman of The Oatmeal claiming that The Oatmeal's posts regarding FunnyJunk's alleged copyright infringement constituted defamation. The letter demanded the removal of references to FunnyJunk and US$20,000 in damages. Inman responded with a blog post on The Oatmeal, containing an annotated copy of the letter, and refusing to comply with the demand. Inman further proposed to raise the requisite $20,000, take a photo of himself with the cash, and send the photograph along with a satirical illustration of FunnyJunk's mother "seducing a Kodiak bear" to FunnyJunk. Rather than pay the damages, Inman proposed to donate the money to two charities, the National Wildlife Federation and the American Cancer Society. This blog post elicited more popular support for Inman and The Oatmeal than anticipated, and the fundraising effort "Operation BearLove Good. Cancer Bad." generated the $20,000 in 64 minutes and over $100,000 in under 24 hours, and at completion he raised $220,024. Inman also responded via counsel. On June 21, 2012, Carreon abandoned FunnyJunk's demands because of misinformation.

The incident spurred commentary by Dan Mitchell of SF Weekly on how the Digital Millennium Copyright Act places the onus of policing violations on content creators and by Maxwell S. Kennerly Esquire of the Beasley Firm LLC on whether public accusations of copyright infringement are defamatory.

In the aftermath of the blog post, FunnyJunk took down all pages Inman linked as infringement and Carreon sought to hide his e-mail address due to a flood of e-mail. Carreon expressed surprise, stating: "I really did not expect that he would marshal an army of people who would besiege my website and send me a string of obscene emails." On June 14, 2012, Carreon replaced his contact page with one saying, "Due to security attacks instigated by Matt Inman, this function has been temporarily disabled." Inman, however, disputed the assertion that he had instigated an attack, noting in a blog post that Carreon's contact information had been redacted from his initial comic and that he had never directed anyone to attack Carreon. Carreon's website, Twitter account and WordPress site were all attacked, but he says "I welcome the opportunity to confront legally the misuse of a new technology."

Carreon claimed that a user identifying themselves as "Modelista" at Ars Technica registered the Charles_Carreon account at Twitter on June 14, 2012. Carreon tried to identify the operator of the impostor account by subpoenaing Twitter and Ars Technica. Carreon filed a notice of voluntary dismissal on July 3, 2012. As of September 2012, the account was suspended.

Carreon sent Indiegogo a request to halt Inman's charity fundraiser as a terms of service violation, alleging that the charities' names are misrepresented in violation of California law, and Inman will profit. Inman promised, "I won't use any of the money on legal fees." and "100% of it is going to charity." Indiegogo investigated the allegations and did not suspend the campaign.

When Operation BearLove Good, Cancer Bad ended, Matthew Inman said that he still plans to go with his plan of taking a picture of the money, sending it to Carreon with the satirical picture, and donating the money, though now both the National Wildlife Federation and the American Cancer Society get $105,611.52 each instead of $10,000 each. Inman negotiated to receive the sum in $20 bills from the bank. As of July 1, 2012 Inman has already withdrawn and photographed his own funds, posting the images on July 9. Glenn Fleishman participated in and reported the photo shoot. Inman sent FunnyJunk a framed print of the satirical drawing and a photo of the cash spelling out "F. U."

== Carreon v. Inman et al ==
On June 15, 2012, Carreon filed a pro se lawsuit Carreon v. Inman et al in the United States District Court for the Northern District of California in Oakland against Inman, Indiegogo Inc., the American Cancer Society, the National Wildlife Federation and a hundred anonymous Internet users for allegations related to the Oatmeal case. In the filing, Carreon says he donated to the fundraiser, which would give him legal standing for his lawsuit. Carreon stated that he wants to prevent charity fraud like the donations from being diverted from NWF and ACS to Inman, Indiegogo or other undisclosed charities. Inman responded to the lawsuit with a blog post, but was advised against giving interviews.

Indiegogo responded with a statement calling the lawsuit "frivolous." Lawyer Rebecca E. Hoffman of Bloomberg BNA said Carreon's case could "only be described as frivolity on top of frivolousness."

On June 21, 2012, the case of Carreon v. Inman et al was assigned to Judge Edward M. Chen. On the same day, the Electronic Frontier Foundation announced that it would represent Inman, stating, "This lawsuit is a blatant attempt to abuse the legal process to punish a critic."

On June 25, Carreon amended his lawsuit against Inman and the other defendants to include Kamala Harris, the Attorney General of California. On June 30, Carreon also requested a temporary restraining order to stop disbursement of the donations. On July 1, 2012, Inman's and Indiegogo's attorneys filed opposition. According to their filings, credit card donations held by Indiegogo were disbursed directly to the National Wildlife Foundation and the American Cancer Society on June 29 while donations via PayPal were held in a PayPal account. Inman wrote checks to the charities against the PayPal balance and gave them to his lawyer. Inman withdrew and photographed his own funds, posting the images on July 9.

On July 3, 2012, Carreon filed a notice of voluntary dismissal in his lawsuit against all parties without prejudice. Carreon declared, "Mission Accomplished," in an interview with Ars Technica and told Comic Riffs, “Inman aborted his ‘publicity stunt’ to photograph himself with the proceeds that were intended to go to charity, the court took cognizance of the issues and ordered Inman to deposit evidence of his disposition of the funds, and Inman deposited the evidence of payments made to the charities.” Carreon wrote to MSNBC.com, "While it's not the largest sum of money I have ever had a substantial role in raising, it is the first time I've seen it go to charity, and I think it's great." Carreon went on to propose a mud wrestling match with Inman but Inman declined. Robert X. Cringely wrote that Carreon's actions in the dispute made him "Internet Enemy No. 1."

== Doe v. Carreon ==
In June, a critic of Carreon set up the site charles-carreon.com, a blog that pretends to be written by Carreon while satirically criticizing him. The Charles Carreon Esq. character is obsessed with dinosaurs. On June 21, 2012, Carreon sent Register.com a letter demanding that they disclose the site's owner. Register.com acquiesced and briefly revealed the owner's name in the site's WHOIS information. "Satirical Charles" was represented by Paul Levy of Public Citizen pro bono. Levy filed a federal suit Doe v. Carreon to seek a declaratory judgment to protect the satirical site's owner in July 2012. After evading service, Carreon agreed in December 2012 to settle for costs of $725. He then "engaged in unnecessary, vexatious, and costly tactics" to determine the proper amount of attorney fees, but was ultimately ordered to pay $46,100.25.

== Rapeutation.com ==
On July 7, 2012, Carreon released a music video "Psycho Santa: The Heroic Exploits of Matt Inman / A Work of Perpendicular Fact" on his new site Rapeutation.com. Carreon alleges that he was the victim of a "Distributed Internet Reputation Attack (DIRA)" perpetrated by "large numbers of both human and digital Internet zombies" acting in concert. Carreon claims to have evidence of a denial-of-service attack.

== See also ==
- Strategic lawsuit against public participation (SLAPP)
