= Dan Tynan =

American journalist and commentator

Daniel Tynan is an American journalist, television and radio commentator who specializes in technology, humor, and humorous takes on technology. Former editor in chief of Yahoo Tech, he has also served as an Executive Editor and later contributing editor for PC World, InfoWorld.com, Family Circle and other publications that have gone on to the great magazine Valhalla in the sky.

Tynan formerly wrote the Our Digital Life (formerly Tech Smart) column for US Airways Magazine, Gadget Freak for PC World, Thank You For Not Sharing and for ITworld, Modern Family for Yahoo Tech.

His work has appeared in more than 75 publications, including Newsweek, Family Circle, Popular Science, Wired, and Playboy.com. He has appeared on CNN, CBS, NPR, Discovery, and Fox News, as well as dozens of regional television and radio programs.

His satirical blog, The WitList, was featured in the journal Editor and Publisher, as well as The Huffington Post, and TPM Cafe.

As of 2023, Tynan regularly publishes content to his blog, Cranky Old Man Yells at Internet. He also writes in-depth brand journalism articles that are regularly published on Forbes.

== Select awards ==
- Two-time finalist for a National Magazine Award
- 2019 Folio Eddie & Ozzie Award, Best Consumer Parenting Column/Blog, "Talking About," Family Circle magazine
- 2005, ASBPE Gold award for news article, 80,000+ circulation class, "Dawn of the Superworm" (author)
- 2002, 2003 Western Publications Association 'Maggie' for Best Regularly Featured Online Column, CNET (author)
- 1999 Grand Neal Award for Editorial Excellence, "Privacy in the Age of the Internet," September 1998 (editor)
- 1997 Jesse H. Neal Award, Best News Story, "Ram Scam," PC World, June 1996 (co-author with Christina Wood and Angela Freeman)
- 1995 Jesse H. Neal Award, Best Single Article, "DOA or Bound for Glory," PC World, June 1994 (co-author with Christina Wood and Anita Amirezzvani)

== Books ==
- Computer Privacy Annoyances, 2005, O'Reilly Media, ISBN 0-596-00775-2
