= Scam letters =

Type of fraudulent document

A scam letter is a document, distributed electronically or otherwise, to a recipient misrepresenting the truth with the aim of gaining an advantage in a fraudulent manner.

== Origin ==
Currently it is unclear how far back the origin of scam letters date. The oldest reference to the origin of scam letters could be found at the Spanish Prisoner scam. This scam dates back to the 1580s, where the fictitious prisoner would promise to share non-existent treasure with the person who would send him money to bribe the guards.

Today scam letters are a general part of electronic life, ending up in mailboxes in hordes.

== Types ==
=== Lottery scam letter ===
Based on mostly the same principles as the Nigerian 419 advance-fee fraud scam, this scam letter informs recipients that their e-mail addresses have been drawn in online lotteries and that they have won large sums of money. Here the victims will also be required to pay substantial small amounts of money in order to have the winning money released, which never materializes.

=== Phishing scam letter ===
Phishing scam letters, in short, are a notification from an online 'financial institution', requiring its clients to log into their accounts and verify or change their log-in details. A fraudulent website is set up by offenders, which appears to be the website of the actual financial institution. Once a victim follows the log-in link from the scam letter and logs into the 'account', the log-in details are sent to the offenders.

=== Cheap Viagra and software product scam letter ===
This is yet another scam where the misrepresentation is made as an offer for cheap medical products and computer software. Often, when ordered, victims will not receive the goods or in certain instances a fake version of the goods ordered.

=== Dating love scam letter ===
Often users will find the letter from a young and attractive female wanting to meet or relocate to the users' country. After invoking their confidence trick on the user they will require the recipient of the scam letter to pay the funds necessary for the relocation. Once paid, the correspondence ends and the writer never appears.

=== Subscription scam ===
Users of some Web sites are sometimes faced with invoices from Internet sites which they have visited. One company with a reputation for this is the Swiss-German based company Media Intense GmBH, which runs win-load.net. Users are asked to create an account before downloading a piece of software. The terms and conditions state that the account requires a subscription of 8 euros per month for a minimum of 24 months, but that the user forfeits the right to cancel. The user will then receive threatening invoices from the company.

Today there exist many forms of scam letters distributed on the Internet. The mentioned examples above act as an indication of how these scam letters work and how victims are defrauded.

== Distribution ==
=== Postal services ===
In the past, before the introduction of electronic communications, scam letters were posted by normal postal services, which had been a slow and tedious method of defrauding victims. Although this method tremendously decreased its appearance today, it still occurs that a victim might receive the posted scam letter.

=== Fax ===
Faxed scam letters are in no way an uncommon occurrence. Today many scam letters are still faxed to corporate institutions, although they are not a large amount due to cost restraints on behalf of offenders.

=== Electronic mail ===
E-mail is today the prevalent way in which scam letters are distributed. Due to its cost-effectiveness and international reach, offenders prefer this method as victims are reached in a much more timely manner.

=== Forums and chat rooms ===
Often offenders will target busy Internet-based forums and chat rooms where they will circulate their scam letters to registered users.

== Law enforcement ==
Generally, law enforcement agencies from around the world are interested in scam letters where actual losses incurred upon a victim. Due to the sheer volume of scam letters distributed on the Internet, no law enforcement agency will be in a position to investigate every scam letter reported.

Most law enforcement agencies have a method of reporting scam letters to them.

=== Penalty ===
On June 25, 2008, 44-year-old Edna Fiedler of Olympia, Washington pleaded guilty in a Tacoma court. She was sentenced to two years imprisonment and five years of supervised release or probation in an Internet $1 million "Nigerian check scam". She conspired to commit bank, wire and mail fraud against US citizens, specifically using Internet by having an accomplice ship counterfeit checks and money orders to her from Lagos, Nigeria in November 2007. Fiedler shipped out $609,000 fake check and money orders when arrested and prepared to send additional $1.1 million counterfeit materials. Also, the U.S. Postal Service intercepted $2.1 billion in counterfeit checks, lottery tickets and eBay overpayment schemes with a face value of $2.1 billion.

== See also ==
- Fraud
- Confidence tricks
- Phishing
- Spanish Prisoner
- Economic and Financial Crimes Commission (EFCC), the Nigerian financial authority mandated to investigate against advance fee frauds
- PhoneBusters, a Canadian law enforcement project combatting advance fee fraud
- Nigerian organized crime
