= Voluntary dismissal =

Termination of a lawsuit at the plaintiff's request

Voluntary dismissal is termination of a lawsuit by voluntary request of the plaintiff (the party who originally filed the lawsuit). A voluntary dismissal with prejudice (meaning the plaintiff is permanently barred from further litigating the same subject matter) is the modern descendant of the common law procedure known as retraxit.

In the United States, voluntary dismissal in Federal court is subject to Rule 41(a) of the Federal Rules of Civil Procedure. Rule 41(a)'s full text can be found below. Simply stated, Rule 41(a) allows the plaintiff to make a dismissal as long as the defendant has not filed an answer or filed a motion for summary judgment.

If the defendant has taken such action, dismissal is only proper under two circumstances:

a. all defendants stipulate to dismissal; or

b. the judge overseeing the case rules for the case to be dismissed

Once the case has been voluntarily dismissed, if it is brought to court again a dismissal in this second case will mean the case can never again be brought back to court.

If the defendant has a counterclaim, the case can only be dismissed if the counterclaim can still stand as its own case.

Full text of Rule 41 (a) of the Federal Rules of Civil Procedure:

(a) Voluntary Dismissal: Effect Thereof

(1) By Plaintiff; By Stipulation. Subject to the provisions of Rule 23(e), of Rule 66, and of any statute of the United States, an action may be dismissed by the plaintiff without order of court (i) by filing notice of dismissal at any time before service by the adverse party of an answer or of a motion for summary judgment, whichever first occurs, or (ii) by filing a stipulation of dismissal signed by all parties who have appeared in the action. Unless otherwise stated in the notice of dismissal or stipulation, the dismissal is without prejudice, except that a notice of dismissal operates as an adjudication upon the merits when filed by a plaintiff who has once dismissed in any court of the United States or of any state an action based on or including the same claim.

(2) By Order of Court. Except as provided in paragraph (1) of this subdivision of this rule, an action shall not be dismissed at the plaintiff's instance save upon order of the court and upon such terms and conditions as the court deems proper. If a counterclaim has been pleaded by a defendant prior to the service upon the defendant of the plaintiff's motion to dismiss, the action shall not be dismissed against the defendant's objections unless the counterclaim can remain pending for independent adjudication by the court. Unless otherwise specified in the order, a dismissal under this paragraph is without prejudice.

== See also ==
- Nolle prosequi
