= Clean Power Finance =

US solar financial services and software company

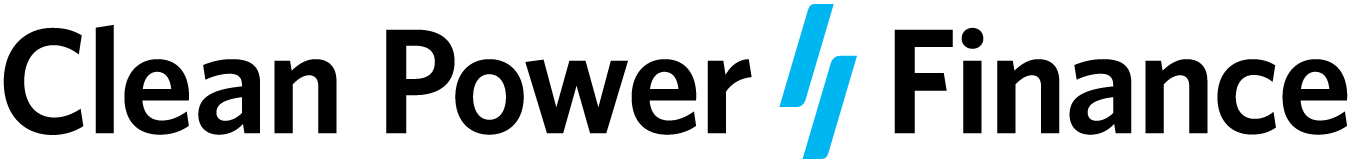
- Industry: Solar energy
- Founded: 2006
- Defunct: 2016
- Fate: Merged with Kilowatt Financial
- Successor: Spruce Finance
- Headquarters: 201 Mission Street, 11th Floor San Francisco, California, 94105 U.S.
- Key people: Nat Kreamer; Mike Pope; Kristian Hanelt; Arash Boostani; Tom Harvey; Kirstin Hoefer; Nick Mack; Micah Myers; Steve Olszewski; Shawn Tabak; James Tong; Elaine Zhou
- Website: www.cleanpowerfinance.com

Clean Power Finance, headquartered in San Francisco, California, is a financial services and software company for the residential solar industry.

Clean Power Finance operates the CPF Market, an online business-to-business platform that connects institutional investors and lenders with residential solar professionals who need solar finance products to grow their businesses. The company was founded in 2006 by Match.com founder and serial entrepreneur Gary Kremen, and for the first five years sold CPF Tools to solar installers and originators.

In early 2011, Nat Kreamer, a co-founder of Sunrun, joined the company as CEO. In April 2011, the company began making residential solar finance products available to qualified channel partners. Finance products allow installers to offer a variety of financing options to consumers who want less expensive solar electricity immediately without the hassle and expense of photovoltaic solar system ownership. Clean Power Finance operates the largest network of solar professionals in the United States.

Clean Power Finance has raised more than a billion dollars in residential solar project financing, and currently manages more than half a billion dollars on behalf of fund investors, including Google Inc. ($75MM), Kilowatt Financial ($250MM), an unnamed utility holding company, and Integrys Energy Group subsidiary Integrys Energy Services

In 2011, the United States Department of Energy awarded Clean Power Finance a $3MM grant as part of its SunShot Initiative to build a database and software tool to streamline solar permitting processes. In 2012, the DOE awarded Clean Power Finance two more grants. The first, for $500,000, supported development of an online marketplace for Operations and Maintenance (O&M) services on installed residential solar systems. The second, for $1 million, supports online tools for solar companies to connect to sell and install residential solar more efficiently.

The company currently operates in nine states: Arizona, California, Colorado, Connecticut, Hawaii, Massachusetts, Maryland, New Jersey and New York.

Clean Power Finance is an active solar industry leader. CEO Nat Kreamer was named a White House Champion of Change in the Veterans in Clean Energy and Climate Security category and was elected in May 2014 to serve as chairman of the board of directors at the Solar Energy Industries Association (SEIA). Micah Myers, SVP of Corporate Development, is on the board of directors at the Solar Electric Power Association (SEPA). The company has played a leading role in helping traditional power companies invest in the residential DG solar market.

In 2016, Clean Power Finance merged with Kilowatt Financial to form Spruce Finance Inc.

== DOE projects ==
Clean Power Finance is working on four DOE-supported projects: the National Solar Permitting Database, an O&M marketplace for solar installations, a website to connect solar specialists, and a Big Data project with the DOE's National Renewable Energy Laboratory (NREL) to reduce customer acquisition costs.

1. The National Solar Permitting Database (NSPD) is a free, online database of information related to solar permitting requirements in cities and counties around the U.S. The project's goal is to minimize the time and resources required to complete a solar permit, which can add significant costs and delays for solar installers. In June 2013, Clean Power Finance debuted SolarPermit.org, which hosts the NSPD.
2. The second project involves O&M for solar installations. Ongoing system operations and maintenance is a concern that has kept potential solar project financiers out of the market. The O&M Marketplace, currently in beta mode, would help system owners, particularly third-party financiers, identify and contract with O&M service providers.
3. The third project is an online tool to allow companies with expertise in selling and marketing solar to efficiently connect and work with companies that specialize in solar installation.
4. The fourth project is in collaboration with the National Renewable Energy Laboratory in Golden, Colorado. Clean Power Finance is the only solar company involved in the project. It joins seven academic institutions to support NREL in developing a computational model that will analyze data from a network of U.S. solar installers and help identify new types of community- and regional-scale strategies that drive down solar financing and deployment costs.

In 2012, Clean Power Finance completed a study of 273 solar installers in the top 12 states encompassing over 90% of residential solar market. This is the largest known study of residential solar installers to date. The goal was to assess current challenges with solar permitting and identify specific opportunities for improvement among the various authorities having jurisdictions (AHJs) that hold approval power in the completion of solar projects. Key findings include:

  - More than 1 in 3 installers avoid selling solar in an average of 3.5 jurisdictions because of associated permitting difficulties.
  - Re-submissions of plans occur in 24% of all installations and rework in 16% of all installations, respectively.
  - An average installation requires nearly 8 weeks to be processed by all relevant jurisdictions; staff times for installers, however, average just 14.25 hours.
  - 13% of installations see requirements change during the installation process.
  - 11% of installations encounter a situation where requirements for solar permitting have not even been set.
  - Difficulties with solar permitting are costly to both AHJs and the solar businesses.

== Equity Investors ==
Clean Power Finance is a privately held company. Its venture capital investors include four traditional electric power companies - Duke Energy, Edison International and two that chose to remain unnamed - Kleiner Perkins Caufield & Byers, Google Ventures, Hennessey Capital Management, Claremont Creek Ventures, Clean Pacific Ventures, and Sand Hill Angels. Clean Power Finance's board of directors is chaired by Rajiv Ghatalia and includes Ed Feo, Joe Kraus, Nat Kreamer, and Ben Kortlang.
