= Gary Kremen =

American engineer, entrepreneur and politician (born 1963)

Gary Kremen (born 20 September 1963) is an American engineer, entrepreneur and politician who founded the personals site Match.com, was the first registrant of Sex.com and founder of Clean Power Finance, and was a board member of the Santa Clara Valley Water District from 2014 through 2022. Since 1993, Kremen has been a private and angel investor in over 100 companies (individually or through venture capital funds), of which several have gone public or had liquidity events.

== Early life ==
Born in Chicago and raised in a Jewish household in nearby Lincolnwood, Illinois, Kremen graduated from Niles West High School in 1981. He then graduated with bachelor's degrees in electrical engineering and computer science from Northwestern University in 1985 and an MBA from Stanford University in 1989.

== Business career ==
Kremen launched the software firm Los Altos Technology and headed the company until late 1992.

In 1993, Kremen founded Match.com. Funded by private investors in November 1994, he launched the online personals service Match.com in April 1995. After troubles with venture capitalists over his insistence that the company serve profitable alternative market segments including the LGBT market, he left Match.com in March 1996, remaining on the board. Over Kremen's objections, Match.com was sold to Cendant Corporation for $7 million in 1998 and sold by Cendant to Ticketmaster a year and a half later for $50 million.

From 1995 to 1996, Kremen co-founded and served as president of NetAngels.com, Inc., an Internet profiling and personalization company that suggested web sites to users. It merged with Firefly Networks, and then was sold to Microsoft.

In 1999, Kremen was listed as an equity-holding officer or director of Brightcube, Inc. The same year, he sold Computer.com for $500,000.

Kremen is credited as a primary inventor on a 1995-filed patent for dynamic web pages, US patent number 5,706,434, which he later sold for over $1,000,000. Additionally, Kremen holds two other patents in financial-related systems management: US patent number 7,698,219 and US patent number 7,890,436. and a patent for verifying employment online: United States Patent number 8,533,110.

A 2007 New York Times article on "millionaires who don't feel rich" reported that Kremen estimated his net worth at $10 million.

Kremen is the founder of residential solar financing start-up Clean Power Finance, Inc., which raised $6.9 million from investors in January 2010, $25 million from Kleiner Perkins, $75 million from Google in September 2011, and $62 million from other investors.

He was also founder and chairman of Sociogramics, a financial services company that focuses on bringing credit to the underbanked, having raised seed capital from Tugboat Ventures, Harmony Venture Partners, Trinity Ventures, Greylock Partners, Claremont Creek Ventures, and QED Investors.

Kremen is the founding investor and a board member of CrowdFlower, WaterSmart Software and CapGain Solutions as well as involved with local non-profit organizations. He is also a co-founder of Menlo Incubator, which is an early-stage startup program that focuses heavily on mentorship and Cross Coin Ventures. On February 24, 2014, Identiv appointed him a member of the Board of Directors.

Kremen is a University of California, Merced foundation board member. He is also a board member of the nonprofit Saline Preservation Association.

== Political career ==
Kremen was an elected board member and president of the local Purissima Hills Water District from 2010 to 2014. Kremen's romantic partner Essy Stone now serves on that board. Kremen was appointed to the Proposition 39 Citizens Oversight Board by California State Controller John Chiang in January 2014.

Kremen was elected to the Santa Clara Valley Water District Board of Directors in the 2014 election, after spending $479,000 on the election for a job that paid $53,626.74, described as "stunning...for a water board election". On January 13, 2015, the Board elected him as the 2015 Board Chair. He was re-elected in 2018 after spending only about $10,000 on his campaign. In 2022, he cast a key vote in a 4-3 decision to put a "deliberately misleading" initiative on the ballot, which claimed to be imposing term limits on the Water Board, but which actually lengthened the existing (and unmentioned) term limits. The vote cost the water board's taxpayers $3.2 million dollars, and barely passed with 50.56% of the public vote. This initiative extended Kremen's own term as well as the terms of board members who had been there for 26 and 22 years, with salaries and benefits up to $79,000 per year for the part-time job.

Kremen was at some point appointed by the Water Board to The Delta Conveyance Design and Construction Joint Powers Authority.

He ran for the political job of Santa Clara County Assessor in 2021 and 2022, seeking to unseat 27-year incumbent Larry Stone. After contributing $170,000 of his own money, and raising another $71,000 from others, he dropped his campaign in February 2022 after getting into conflict with a campaign staffer, who resigned and took her complaints public. He asked a staffer to sift through a large photo dump, looking for photos useful to the campaign, but the staffer stopped and was outraged when she saw pictures which included Kremen's breastfeeding romantic partner with one breast visible. The partner, Essy Stone, reportedly said, "He was just being careless, there’s nothing malicious about it." But there were other accusations, including bullying, campaigning as a nonprofit, and a threat to harm a Democratic club that planned a Middle East resolution that Kremen opposed. Multiple local politicians rapidly and publicly called on Kremen to step down, leading to him ending the campaign. In addition, the resulting attention revealed 11 internal complaints from Water Board employees, causing Kremen to step down as Water Board Chair, while retaining his board seat. An internal investigation followed.

== Sex.com legal case ==
Kremen first registered the domain name sex.com in 1994 as well as jobs.com, housing.com, and autos.com. In 1995, Stephen M. Cohen contacted Network Solutions and fraudulently had the domain transferred to his name. Kremen sued Cohen for the return of the sex.com domain name. As Cohen had profited from sex.com while it was assigned to him, Kremen was awarded a judgment of $65 million against Cohen. Cohen fled to Mexico and moved the money offshore. Kremen obtained Cohen's Rancho Santa Fe mansion, to which he relocated after the court case resolved. In 2003, Kremen successfully litigated against Network Solutions. On October 28, 2005, the Los Angeles Times reported Cohen had been arrested in Mexico and turned over to US authorities. Kremen sold sex.com in 2006 to Boston-based Escom LLC for $15 million in cash and stock, and sold sex.net for $454,500 later that year.

== Additional reading ==
- David Kushner, The Players Ball. NY:Simon& Schuster, 2019 ISBN 9781501122149 (an account of the conflict between Gary Kremen and Stephen Michael Cohen for control of the internet domain sex.com).
