= Sex.com =

Internet domain name and web portal

sex.com
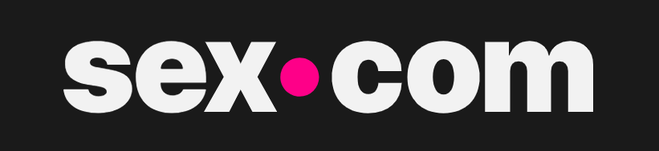
- Website type: Pornography
- Owner: Clover Holdings LTD
- Creator: Sex.com Team
- Website: sex.com
- Commercial: Yes
- Registration: No
- Launched: May 9, 1994; 32 years ago
- Current status: Active

Sex.com is an Internet domain name and web portal currently owned by Clover Holdings LTD. The domain name was the focus of one of the most publicized legal actions about ownership of domain names. Kieren McCarthy, a journalist who followed the case, wrote the book Sex.com, which was published in 2007.

== Gary Kremen (1994–1995) ==
In early 1994, entrepreneur Gary Kremen (who also founded Match.com and Clean Power Finance) registered sex.com with Network Solutions.

== Stephen M. Cohen and legal battle (1995–2006) ==
On October 18, 1995, Network Solutions transferred, without permission, the domain to Stephen M. Cohen, who had been trying to gain control of the domain for some time by misrepresentation, using phone calls, e-mails and forged letters. He eventually persuaded an employee of Network Solutions to change the ownership details by submitting a fake fax. After gaining control of the domain, Cohen produced an advertising-heavy site that received up to 25 million hits a day. From payments for click-throughs and other advertising, Cohen was reportedly making $50,000 to $500,000 per month. Kremen undertook steps to recover the domain, while Cohen claimed he obtained the domain legally from Online Classifieds (OCI). A five-year legal battle ensued, led by cyberlawyer Charles Carreon.

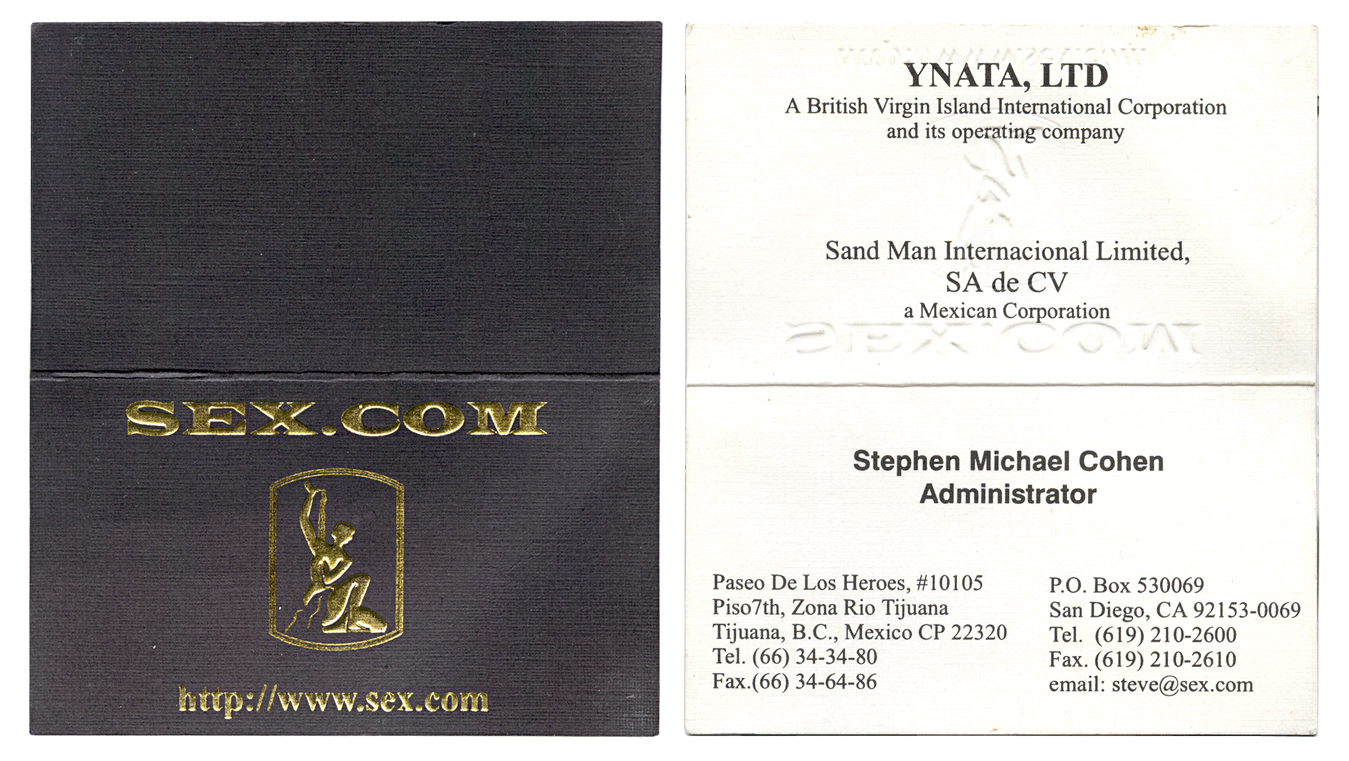
Stephen M. Cohen's Sex.com business card

Kremen was victorious in November 2000, when Network Solutions was ordered to return the domain to the plaintiff. According to the record of Kremen v. Cohen, Cohen was ordered to pay $25 million into court; in April 2001, the California District Court awarded Kremen an additional $40 million for lost earnings, for a total judgment of $65 million. Cohen appealed the judgment and refused to allow assessment of his business: he provided false information and declared most of his companies bankrupt while illegally moving assets out of US jurisdiction. When an arrest warrant was issued, Cohen fled to Mexico. Kremen offered a $50,000 reward for information, but Cohen remained at large while continuing to file appeals that were rejected. In October 2005, Cohen was arrested in Tijuana, Mexico for immigration violations, and was handed over to US authorities.

Kremen settled his lawsuit against Network Solutions for an undisclosed amount. Cohen has continued to avoid paying the $67 million judgment, and claims poverty. Courts have found in Kremen's favor several times since 2006, with evidence that seven individuals and twelve companies were used to help Cohen hide the money, including his brother, his daughter, his ex-wife and also his former lawyer. A court case against his brother is ongoing.

== Escom LLC (2006–2010) ==
Sex.com was reportedly sold to Escom LLC in January 2006. At a reported $14 million price, the domain name had widely been cited as the highest priced domain sale.

On February 18, 2010, the domain name was ordered to be sold at a foreclosure auction. On March 18, 2010, a day before the auction, creditors of Escom, LLC filed an involuntary Chapter 11 bankruptcy petition to prevent a possible loss of value by selling the name at foreclosure. At Mike Mann's request the domain was brought to Sedo to be auctioned.

== Clover Holdings LTD (2010–2012) ==
On October 20, 2010, Sedo reportedly completed the auction, filing in a California court that it had approved the sale for $13 million to a Clover Holdings LTD. A bankruptcy hearing was held on October 27, 2010 to determine if the sale was finalized and approved by all creditors. On November 18, 2010, Sedo confirmed the new sale price in a press release, and marked the previous sale at $11.5 million, negating the claimed $14 million buying price published in 2006.

== Pinterest for porn (2012–present) ==
Sex.com relaunched in May 2012 marketing itself as a Pinterest for porn.
