= Stephen M. Cohen =

American fraudster

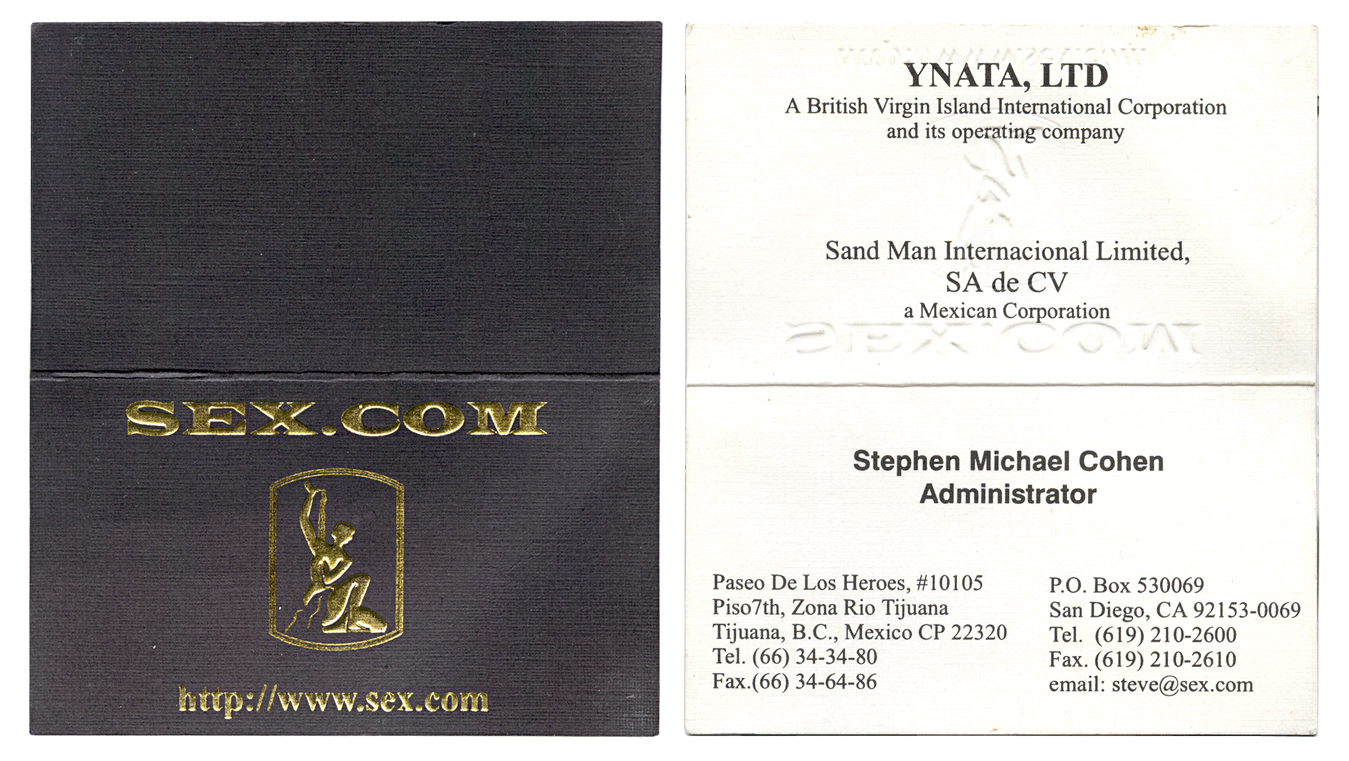
Business card

Stephen Michael Cohen is an American who gained notoriety after acquiring control of the domain name Sex.com in 1995. He also has citizenship in Mexico, in Israel and in the principality of Monaco. He was later implicated in involvement in running the controversial peer-to-peer service EarthStation 5.

Cohen was born in Los Angeles and attended Van Nuys High School in the Van Nuys area of Los Angeles. He obtained his Juris Doctor (JD) degree at the University of Southern California Law School in 1972.

In the 1980s, he operated a paid-membership bulletin board system (BBS) called the French Connection, geared toward swinging and other sexual topics, and by the late 1980s, he organized swinger get-togethers at a home in Orange County, California. In 1990, he was arrested for operating a sex club in a residential zone; he was found not guilty in a jury trial.

== Sex.com ==
According to court documents, Cohen fraudulently obtained Sex.com, a lucrative Internet domain name, in May 1995 from the original registrant, Gary Kremen, who had registered it in May 1994. Cohen obtained the domain by means of a forged letter to domain registrar Network Solutions, faxed from Kremen's company "Online Classified", fraudulently stating that Kremen had been dismissed and the firm was abandoning the domain and that Cohen could have it. Network Solutions blindly accepted the fax with no verification and transferred the domain to Cohen, an action that would prove grounds for a later civil suit by Kremen against Network Solutions. It is estimated that Cohen illegally earned $100 million between October 1995 and November 2000 from his ownership of sex.com.

In April 2001, the court ordered damages of $65 million be paid to Kremen. Cohen left the United States in 2001 and was living in Tijuana, Mexico, when he was arrested on October 28, 2005. As of 2011, the amount of damages owed to Kremen had increased to $82 million, and Cohen had refused to pay any of it.

Cohen was held in a civil contempt for failure to disclose his assets. On December 5, 2006, Judge James Ware released him from custody because "Kremen has failed to locate evidence of hidden bank accounts or other assets". Courts have ruled in Kremen's favor several times since 2006, with evidence that seven individuals, including some of Cohen's family members, and twelve companies were used to help him hide the money.

Since Cohen's right to the domain was revoked in 2006, it was sold to Escom LLC in 2006 and Clover Holdings LTD in 2010, which rebranded the site to a porn collection in 2012.

== Additional reading ==
*David Kushner, The Players Ball. ' NY:Simon& Schuster, 2019 ISBN 9781501122149 (an account of the conflict between Gary Kremen and Stephen Michael Cohen for control of the internet domain sex.com).
