= Mass marketing fraud =

Fraud involving mass media

Mass-marketing fraud (or mass market fraud) is a scheme that uses mass-communication media – including telephones, the Internet, mass mailings, television, radio, and personal contact – to contact, solicit, and obtain money, funds, or other items of value from multiple victims in one or more jurisdictions. The frauds where victims part with their money by promising cash, prizes, and services and high returns on investment are part of mass market fraud.

== Characteristics and classification ==
Such scams or consumer frauds generally fall into four categories:

1. Pretending to sell something you do not have, and taking the money
2. Supplying goods or services which are of lower quality than those paid for, or failing to supply the goods and services sought
3. Persuading customers to buy something they do not really want through oppressive marketing techniques
4. Disguising one's identity in order to perpetrate a fraud

Alternatively, mass market fraud may also be classified as follows:

1. On basis of communication mechanism: 'Internet fraud', 'mail fraud' and 'tele-marketing fraud'
2. On basis of Scheme central to fraud: 'lottery fraud', 'insurance fraud', 'loan fraud', 'mobile tower fraud', 'quiz fraud'

Victim reporting reveals that Internet-based solicitations are among the most common: in the United States, web sites and e-mails accounted for 60 percent of reported contacts in 2009, and Canada noted a 46 percent spike in Internet-related complaints from 2008 to 2009.

As per United States Department of Justice the mass-marketing fraud schemes generally fall into three main categories: (i) advance-fee fraud schemes; (ii) bank and financial account schemes; and (iii) investment opportunities. Advance fee fraud schemes are most popular. This type of scheme is based on the concept that a victim will be promised a substantial benefit – such as a million-dollar prize, lottery winnings, a substantial inheritance, or some other item of value – but must pay in advance some purported fee or series of fees before the victim can receive that benefit.

The mobile phones, internet and electronic media have given following distinct advantages to the mass market fraudsters:

- Low setup cost and mass scale reach
- Fraud at a distance
- Ease in financial transaction

== Nature ==
Mass marketing fraud schemes are predominantly transnational/interstate in nature. Perpetrators operate from multiple foreign countries and utilize the financial infrastructure of one or more countries to transfer and launder funds. Law enforcement investigations have exposed that such schemes operating not only in multiple countries in North America, Europe, and Africa, but in other countries and jurisdictions as diverse as Brazil, Costa Rica, Hong Kong, India, Israel, the Philippines, Thailand, and the United Arab Emirates.

Many of the frauds perpetrated online, work on the principle of large number of victims losing relatively small sums of money. The Office for Fair Trading (2006) research illustrates that in many of the frauds relatively small sums of money are lost – frequently less than £100. The tactic of the fraudster is to secure such a sum of money that the victim will be less bothered to report the fraud.

Mass-marketing fraud – whether committed via the Internet, telemarketing "boiler rooms," the mail, television or radio advertising, mass meetings, or even one-on-one talks over people's kitchen tables, has two elements in common. First, the criminals who conduct any mass-marketing fraud scheme aim to defraud multiple individuals or businesses to maximize their criminal revenues. Second, the schemes invariably depend on persuading victims to transfer money or funds to the criminals based on promises of valuable goods, services, or benefits, and then never delivering the promised goods, services, or benefits to the victims.

The reporting of mass marketing fraud is quite low, as per OFT there is only 1 to 3% reporting.

== Common examples ==
Common mass marketing scams in Australia, Canada, US, UK and other western countries include foreign lotteries and sweepstakes, traditional West African fraud schemes and 419 letter scams, charity scams, romance scams, boiler room or share sale fraud, credit card interest reduction schemes, auction and retail website schemes, investment schemes, counterfeit check fraud schemes (including schemes targeting attorneys), emergency assistance schemes, merchandise purchase/product misrepresentation schemes, psychic/clairvoyant schemes, bank and financial account schemes, recovery schemes, sale of merchandise/overpayment schemes, and service schemes. Bank and financial account schemes not only involve fraud but also identity theft through phishing and vishing. In developing countries including India the lottery scam through e-mails, SMSs and other unsolicited messages, 'Nigerian letter fraud', phishing and pyramid scams are popular. Recently, the Mass Fraud Quiz Competition, normally known as "Chehra pechano" (identify the Face of Actor/Actress), is being run by fraudsters using communication mechanisms such as print media (daily newspaper), television and through online websites. The fraudsters run a quiz campaign in classified/business columns in daily newspapers, also airing on live TV programs on popular Indian channels such as Sony TV, Sahara One, B4U, Mahua, Houseful, Cinema TV and Maha Movie Channel etc., and through online websites.

At present, there is no authoritative statistical data available on financial loss due to mass market frauds. However, in 2006, the United Kingdom Office of Fair Trading (OFT) study estimated that each year 3.2 million United Kingdom adults (6.5 percent of the adult population) fall victim to mass-marketing schemes, collectively losing £3.5 billion. Similarly, a June 2008 study by the Australian Bureau of Statistics (ABS) found 453,100 of those victims (56.2 percent) reportedly lost AU $977 million (US$905.7 million as of June 27, 2008) in selected schemes such as lottery, pyramid, and phishing schemes. In India there is no single agency to estimate the loss due to such mass market fraud. As per IMMFWG, there are strong indications that the order of magnitude of global mass-marketing fraud losses is in the tens of billions of dollars per year.

== Initiatives to combat fraud ==
MMF frauds are committed by fraudsters and the illicit proceeds are received by their counterparts in countries on every continent in the world. Methods of MMF and its money laundering components are similar to drug trafficking. A project led by Financial Crimes Enforcement Network (FinCEN), examined global money flows relating to mass marketing fraud schemes. One of major step to combat the mass marketing Fraud is the formation of International Mass-Marketing Fraud Working Group (IMMFWG) in September 2007. It consists of law enforcement, regulatory, and consumer protection agencies from Australia, Belgium, Canada, Netherlands, Nigeria, UK, US and Europol.

US and Canada had made changes in substantive and procedural laws. Canada made changes in Competition Act (Bill C-20); the Extradition Act and Canada Evidence Act (Bill C-40); and Omnibus Criminal Code Amendments (Bill C-51), as well as legislation related to Proceeds of Crime, and Wiretapping which includes impact on telemarketing cases. US provided significant enhancement to fraud related criminal offenses in the Senior Citizens Against Marketing Scams Act of 1994 and the Deceptive Mail Prevention and Enforcement Act of 2000. One significant piece of legislation affecting mass-marketing fraud that was enacted since 2003 is the U.S. SAFEWEB Act.

Competition Bureau Canada partnered with Ontario Provincial Police (OPP) and Royal Canadian Mounted Police and upgraded earlier telemarketing fraud call centre PhoneBuster to a Canadian Anti-Fraud Centre (CAFC), which is now a central agency in Canada that collects information and criminal intelligence on such matters as mass marketing fraud (i.e.: telemarketing), advance fee fraud (i.e.: West African letters), Internet fraud and identification theft complaints.

Royal Canadian Mounted Police Canada has also started a Reporting Economic Crime On-Line (RECOL) initiative. Canada has created a system known as CANSHARE, a web-based database connecting consumer affairs departments across.

US has had a 'Consumer Sentinel' complaint database maintained by FTC since 1997. Consumer Sentinel collects information about all types of consumer fraud and identity theft from the FTC and over 125 other organizations and makes those data available to law enforcement partners around the world for use in their investigations.

In the United States, the FBI and a nonprofit private-sector entity, the National White Collar Crime Center has started an 'Internet Crime Complaint Center' (IC3) for online reporting of complaints about Internet-related crime like Internet fraud and lottery/sweepstakes scams.

Canadian and American law enforcement authorities have shown great creativity in developing and participating in a wide range of public education and prevention measures that involve cross-border fraud. For example, in Canada, the "Stop Phone Fraud – It's a Trap' marketing campaign, as described above, provided public- and private-sector entities with a variety of educational materials and resources. In the United States, the National Consumers League, with a grant from the United States Department of Justice, developed a "Telemarketing Fraud Education Kit" for distribution to government agencies, nonprofit consumer, civic, community, and labor organizations, and schools.

ScamWatch is a central portal of Government of Australia administered by Australian Competition and Consumer Commission, for issuing news and alert on fraud and scams and online reporting of the frauds and scams. Stay Smart Online is the Australian Government's online safety and security website, designed to help everyone understand the risks and simple steps we can take to protect our personal and financial information online. The 'Little Book of Scams' has been published by Australian Competition and Consumer Commission. The book is available free of cost. The little black book of scams highlights a variety of popular scams that regularly target Australian consumers and small business in areas such as fake lotteries, internet shopping, mobile phones, online banking, employment, investment opportunities.

The Office of Fair Trading in, which is closed now, was earlier responsible for all Mass Marketing Frauds in . OFT had provided the advice and support to the fraud victim through letter or email, leaflets, DVD, website with advice and prevention advice to chronic victims. OFT published the 'Research on impact of mass marketed scams' in December 2006, document on support for victims of fraud and fraud typologies and victims of fraud. The government has a separate act known as the 'Fraud Act' to cover frauds mainly committed by false representation, failing to disclose information and abuse of position.

The 'Action Fraud' is the 's National fraud and internet crime reporting centre. Action fraud covers all type of A-Z frauds including Mass Marketing Frauds. Action Fraud has partnered with charity 'Victim Support' to help the victims.

The Government of New Zealand has also a scamwatch portal on their Consumer Protection Website. The portal is being maintained by Ministry of Business, Innovation and Employment. The aim of Scamwatch is to provide you with information you need to protect yourself from scams, so you can recognize a set-up and avoid the hook and the inevitable sting of a scam. Consumer Protection has teamed up with its trusted partner Netsafe to allow victim report through the ORB. Consumer Affairs does not have investigative or enforcement powers. Fraud Victim Report is sent to Consumer Protection who may publish information about it on the Alerts section of their Scamwatch website. ORB is working with partner agencies to direct victim reports through to the organization best able to investigate or advice on various types of online incidents that include scams and frauds, spam messages, objectionable material, privacy breaches and problems whilst shopping online.
