= Section 420 of the Indian Penal Code =

Indian law related to cheating

In India, Section 420 of the Indian Penal Code (before its repeal by the introduction of the Bharatiya Nyaya Sanhita) dealt with Cheating and dishonestly inducing delivery of property. The maximum punishment was seven years imprisonment and a fine. Section 420 is now Section 318 of the Bharatiya Nyaya Sanhita.

== Description ==
Whoever cheats and thereby dishonestly induces the person deceived to deliver any property to any person, or to make, alter or destroy the whole or any part of a valuable security, or anything which is signed or sealed, and which is capable of being converted into a valuable security, shall be punished with imprisonment of either description for a term which may extend to seven years, and shall also be liable fine.

== Distinction between "cheating" and "breach of contract" ==
The distinction between a mere "breach of contract" and the "offence of cheating" was a fine one. It depended upon the intention of the accused at the time of inducement which may be judged by subsequent conduct, but this subsequent conduct was not the sole test. Mere breach of contract could not give rise to criminal prosecution for cheating unless fraudulent or dishonest intention was shown right at the beginning of the transaction, that is the time when the offence was said to have been committed. Therefore, it was the intention of cheating which was the gist of the offence. To hold a person guilty of cheating, it was necessary to show that they had fraudulent or dishonest intention at the time of committing the act.

== Distinction between "cheating" and "misrepresentation" ==
A mere representation, which was neither claimed or alleged to be dishonest or fraudulent, would not attract the charge of cheating only because the complainant parts with their money on the basis thereof.

== Punishment of an offence under Section 420 ==
The maximum punishment for an offence under section 420 of IPC was imprisonment for a term up to seven years, with or without monetary fine.

== In popular culture ==
The term "420" (read as Char Sau Bees in Hindi) is used in India to refer to a confidence trickster. This section was also in use in other neighboring countries such as Pakistan, Myanmar, where the term 420 persists in popular culture to this date. In the Nigerian Criminal Code, the same offence is covered by article 419, which has now lent its name to the advance fee fraud.

The title of two popular Hindi films – Chachi 420 (in English: Trickster Aunt, a 1997 remake of Mrs. Doubtfire) and Shri 420 (in English: Mr. 420, a 1955 film) – are direct references to Section 420 of the IPC.
