= Message forgery =

Message sent with a fake identity

In cryptography, message forgery is sending a message so to deceive the recipient about the actual sender's identity. A common example is sending a spam or prank e-mail as if it were originated from an address other than the one which was really used.

== Notable Incidents ==
=== 2014 Sony Pictures hack ===
In November 2014, the multinational entertainment studio, Sony Pictures, suffered a huge data leak; over 100 terabytes of confidential company activities were exposed, resulting in well over $100 million lost.

One of the causes of the hack was through the use of message forgery. The phishers gained entry by manipulating the recipient to open the malicious attachments contained in the emails that were posing as colleagues of the top-level employees within the company.

== See also ==
- Phishing
- Message authentication code
- Stream cipher attack
