= Joe job =

Spam forged to frame a third party

A Joe job is a spamming technique in which unsolicited e-mail is sent with forged sender data so that it appears to come from an innocent third party. The aim is to damage that party's reputation or to provoke recipients into retaliating against them.

== Origin and motivation ==
The name "Joe job" comes from a spam attack in January 1997 on joes.com, a site run by Joe Doll that offered free web pages. A user who was barred from the site after promoting his page with spam retaliated by sending new spam forged to look as if it came from joes.com. Recipients who took the spam as genuine hit joes.com with mail bombs and other denial-of-service attacks, which kept the site disabled for more than ten days.

Later Joe jobs have been carried out as revenge against people who spoke out against spam, and by businesses trying to sabotage a competitor.

== Method and effects ==
A Joe job forges the victim's e-mail address as the sender and advertises the victim's website, so the message looks like spam sent by the victim. Bounce messages, complaints and abuse from recipients then go to the victim instead of the real sender.

The victim's hosting or domain provider may cut off service under its anti-spam policy, and spam filters may blacklist the victim's domain.

Sender Policy Framework, DomainKeys Identified Mail and DMARC let a domain owner publish a policy asking receiving mail servers to reject messages that use the domain in the From address without authorization.

== Backscatter ==
Many viruses and spambots forge sender addresses picked at random or automatically, so the owner of a forged address can receive the resulting bounce messages without anyone having targeted them. This is called backscatter.

== See also ==
- Agent provocateur – Person who incites others to commit incriminating acts
- False flag – Covert operation designed to deceive, a similar military concept
- Sporgery – Posting a flood of articles to a Usenet group, with falsified headers
