= Email spoofing =

Creating email spam or phishing messages with a forged sender identity or address

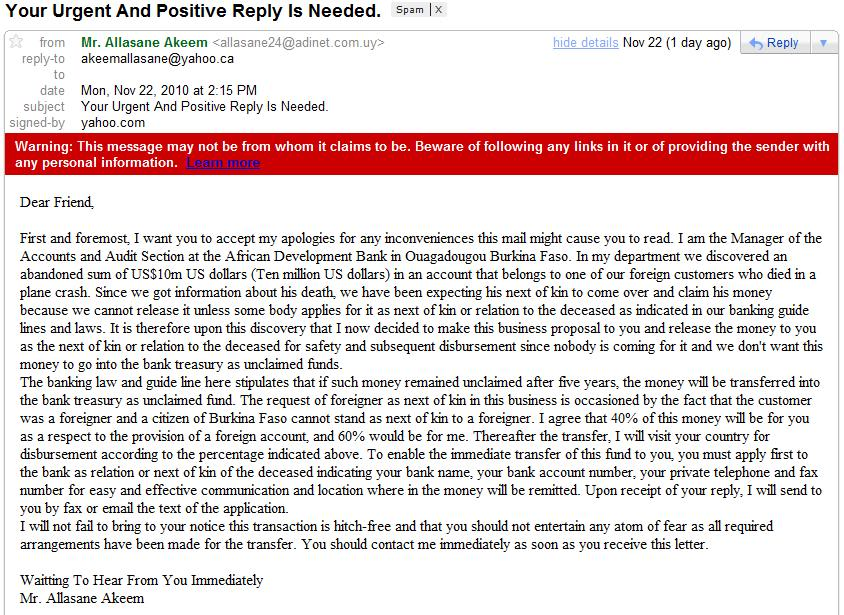
Screenshot of an email with a spoofed sender address

Email spoofing is the creation of email messages with a forged sender address. The term applies to email purporting to be from an address which is not actually the sender's; mail sent in reply to that address may bounce or be delivered to an unrelated party whose identity has been faked. Disposable email address or "masked" email is a different topic, providing a masked email address that is not the user's normal address, which is not disclosed (for example, so that it cannot be harvested), but forwards mail sent to it to the user's real address.

The original transmission protocols used for email do not have built-in authentication methods: this deficiency allows spam and phishing emails to use spoofing in order to mislead the recipient. More recent countermeasures have made such spoofing from internet sources more difficult but they have not eliminated it completely; few internal networks have defences against a spoof email from a colleague's compromised computer on that network. Individuals and businesses deceived by spoof emails may suffer significant financial losses; in particular, spoofed emails are often used to infect computers with ransomware.

== Technical details ==
When a Simple Mail Transfer Protocol (SMTP) email is sent, the initial connection provides two pieces of address information:

- MAIL FROM: generally presented to the recipient as the Return-path: header but not normally visible to the end user, and by default no checks are done that the sending system is authorized to send on behalf of that address.
- RCPT TO: specifies which email address the email is delivered to, is not normally visible to the end user but may be present in the headers as part of the "Received:" header.

Together, these are sometimes referred to as the "envelope" addressing – an analogy to a traditional paper envelope. Unless the receiving mail server signals that it has problems with either of these items, the sending system sends the "DATA" command, and typically sends several header items, including:

- From: Joe Q Doe <joeqdoe@example.com> – the address visible to the recipient, but again, by default no checks are done that the sending system is authorized to send on behalf of that address – and shouldn't in the general case, as the header tells on whose behalf the message was sent
- Reply-to: Jane Roe <Jane.Roe@example.mil> – similarly not checked, as the system cannot know to whom replies to this specific message should be sent
- Sender: Jin Jo <jin.jo@example.jp> – may or may not checked

The result is that the email recipient sees the email as having come from the address in the From: header. They may sometimes be able to find the MAIL FROM address, and if they reply to the email, it will go to either the address presented in the From: or Reply-to: header, but none of these addresses are typically reliable, so automated bounce messages may generate backscatter.

Although email spoofing is effective in forging the email address, the IP address of the computer sending the mail can generally be identified from the "Received:" lines in the email header. In malicious cases, however, this is likely to be the computer of an innocent third party infected by malware that is sending the email without the owner's knowledge.

== Malicious use of spoofing ==
Phishing and business email compromise scams generally involve an element of email spoofing.

Email spoofing has been responsible for public incidents with serious business and financial consequences. This was the case in an October 2013 email to a news agency which was spoofed to look as if it was from the Swedish company Fingerprint Cards. The email stated that Samsung offered to purchase the company. The news spread and the company's stock price surged by 50%.

Malware such as Klez and Sober among many more modern examples often search for email addresses within the computer they have infected, and they use those addresses both as targets for email, and also to create credible forged From fields in the emails that they send. This is to ensure that the emails are more likely to be opened. For example:

1. Alice is sent an infected email which she opens, running the worm code.
2. The worm code searches Alice's email address book and finds the addresses of Bob and Charlie.
3. From Alice's computer, the worm sends an infected email to Bob, but is forged to appear as if it was sent by Charlie.

In this case, even if Bob's system detects the incoming mail as containing malware, he sees the source as being Charlie, even though it really came from Alice's computer. Meanwhile, Alice may remain unaware that her computer has been infected, and Charlie does not know anything about it at all, unless he receives an error message from Bob.

== The effect on mail servers ==
Traditionally, mail servers could accept a mail item, then later send a Non-Delivery Report or "bounce" message if it could not be delivered or had been quarantined for any reason. These would be sent to the "MAIL FROM:" a.k.a. "Return Path" address. With the massive rise in forged addresses, best practice is now to not generate NDRs for detected spam, viruses etc. but to reject the email during the SMTP transaction. When mail administrators fail to take this approach, their systems are guilty of sending "backscatter" emails to innocent parties – in itself a form of spam – or being used to perform "Joe job" attacks. However, a busy server may not be able to do the needed checks at once, and face the choice between possibly losing legitimate emails and sending backscatter.

== Countermeasures ==
The SSL/TLS system used to encrypt server-to-server email traffic can also be used to enforce authentication, but in practice it is seldom used, and a range of other potential solutions have also failed to gain traction.

A number of defensive systems have come into wide use, including:

- Sender Policy Framework (SPF) – an email authentication method designed to detect forging sender addresses during the delivery of the email.
- DomainKeys Identified Mail (DKIM) – an email authentication method designed to detect forged sender addresses in email (email spoofing), a technique often used in phishing and email spam.
- Domain-based Message Authentication, Reporting and Conformance (DMARC) – an email authentication protocol. It is designed to give email domain owners the ability to protect their domain from unauthorized use, commonly known as email spoofing. The purpose and primary outcome of implementing DMARC is to protect a domain from being used in business email compromise attacks, phishing emails, email scams and other cyber threat activities.

To effectively stop forged email being delivered, the sending domains, their mail servers, and the receiving system all need to be configured correctly for these higher standards of authentication. Although their use is increasing, estimates vary widely as to what percentage of emails have no form of domain authentication: from 8.6% to "almost half" in the 2010s For this reason, receiving mail systems typically have a range of settings to configure how they treat poorly-configured domains or email.

While there has been research into improving email security, little emphasis has been placed on informing users whose email addresses have been used for spoofing. Currently, only the email recipient can identify a fake email, and users whose addresses are spoofed remain unaware unless the recipient manually scrutinizes the message or DMARC reporting is enabled.

== Business email ==
Business email compromise attacks are a class of cyber crime that use email fraud to attack organizations. Examples include invoice scams and spear-phishing attacks that are designed to gather data for other criminal activities. A business deceived by an email spoof can suffer additional financial, business continuity and reputational damage. Fake emails can also be used to spread malware.

Typically, an attack targets specific employee roles within an organization by sending spoof emails that fraudulently represent a senior colleague, trusted customer, or supplier. (This type of attack is known as spear phishing). The email will issue instructions, such as approving payments or releasing client data. The emails often use social engineering to trick the victim into making money transfers to the bank account of the fraudster.

The United States' Federal Bureau of Investigation recorded $26 billion of US and international losses associated with BEC attacks between June 2016 and July 2019. More recent figures estimate losses of over $50 billion from 2013 to 2022. In 2025, the FBI's Internet Crime Complaint Center received 24,768 BEC complaints, with reported losses of $3,046,598,558.

=== Incidents ===
- Dublin Zoo lost €130,000 in such a scam in 2017 – a total of €500,000 was taken, though most was recovered.
- The Austrian aerospace firm FACC AG was defrauded of €42 million ($47 million) through an attack in February 2016 – and subsequently fired both the CFO and CEO.
- Te Wananga o Aotearoa in New Zealand was defrauded of $120,000 (NZD).
- The New Zealand Fire Service was scammed out of $52,000 in 2015.
- Ubiquiti Networks lost $46.7 million through such a scam in 2015.
- Save the Children USA was the victim of a $1 million cyberscam in 2017.
- Australian organisations that reported business email compromise attacks on the Australian Competition and Consumer Commission suffered approximately $2,800,000 (AUD) in financial losses for the 2018 year.
- In 2013, Evaldas Rimasauskas and his employees sent thousands of fraud emails to get access to companies' email systems. He was indicted for scheming Google for about $23 million and Facebook for about $98 million from 2013 to 2015. He did that by impersonating the Taiwan-based hardware manufacturer Quanta Computer, the company with which both companies had done business, by setting up a company in Latvia with the same name.

== See also ==
- Chain letter – Letter written in succession by a group of people
- Computer virus – Computer program that modifies other programs to replicate itself and spread
- Computer worm – Self-replicating malware program
- Cyber-security regulation – Information assurance (IA) requirements overview
- Cybercrime – Type of crime based in computer networks
- Domain name#Domain name spoofing – Identification string in the Internet that may be compromised
- DMARC – System to prevent email fraud
- Email authentication – Techniques aimed at providing verifiable information about the origin of email messages
- Hoax – Widespread deliberate fabrication presented as truth
- Joe job – Unsolicited email with spoofed sender data
- Phishing – Form of social engineering
- Prank call – Phone call intended as a joke or prank
- Social engineering (security) – Psychological manipulation in information security
- Website spoofing – Creating a website, as a hoax, with the intention of misleading readers
