= Mobile tower fraud =

"Mobile tower fraud" may be defined as a type of mass marketing fraud with advance fee fraud characteristics, where the central scheme is the installation of a mobile tower in the victim's property. The victims are lured by the promise of huge rental income. Mobile tower fraudsters are targeting individuals of all ages and demographics. With the telecommunication infrastructure booming in India to meet the socioeconomic requirements of the country, mass marketing fraudsters have seen a criminal opportunity in it.

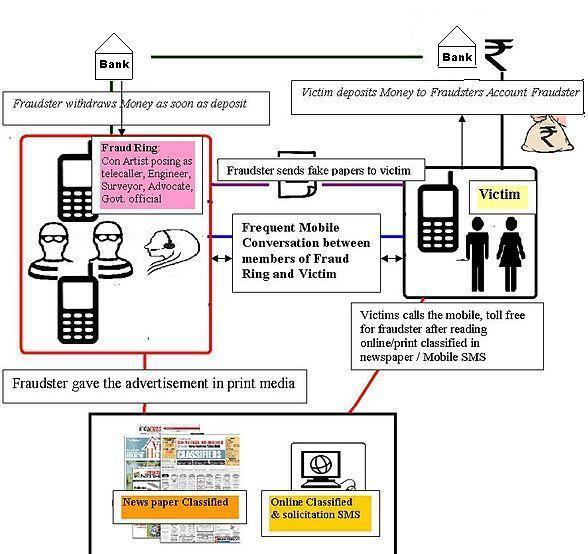
Mode of operation of mobile tower fraud

== Background ==
India is a country with 29 states and 8 union territories spreading across 3,287,240 square km with a population of 1,028,737,436 and a wireless teledensity of 78.93. Mobile phones are being used as the prime tool for contacting the target victims, whereas the internet, print media, television are being used as media to communicate the schemes, business plan, goods and services to the targets by the mass market fraudster. India has seen the emergence of a new type of mass market fraud during the last few years. This mass market fraud centers on the installation of a mobile tower on property owned by the victim. On the basis of scheme, this fraud may be termed "mass mobile tower fraud". Fraudsters have used innovative and sophisticated techniques to get money from victims. This fraud is unique to the Indian subcontinent and it is not mentioned in any discussion of mass market fraud in any of the OFT, FTC, ABS, FBI or IMMFGW documents.

India has a tremendous telecom growth potential and to meet the demand for mobile coverage in rural and urban areas, new mobile towers are being installed by telecom companies. Mobile tower installation has given rise to new forms of business opportunities, i.e. the mobile tower rental business, because telecom companies can not own the land and space for every mobile tower. Hence, for a large number of mobile BTS, the telecom companies are taking privately owned space (vacant rooftop or vacant land) on rental basis from individuals, government offices and other tower companies. The owner of the space/property (rooftop or land) in turn gets a long-term assured monthly rental income from the telecom company. Sometime, the property owner also gets an employment opportunity, such as security guard or caretaker at the mobile tower. Thus, mobile tower renting has emerged as a golden business opportunity for property owners. Mass mobile tower fraudsters primarily uses print media, usually daily newspapers (English, Hindi and in regional languages local and National Dailies) as the initial method of contacting victims. Alternative initial communication media, such as SMS over mobile, direct telemarketing calls, and online free advisement classifieds websites are also being used by mass mobile tower fraud rings. The property owners who are willing to offer their land or rooftop space and are looking for such mobile tower rental business deals makes the telephonic contact with the telephone/mobile number published in the newspaper, online classified website or mentioned in SMS. Irrespective of the initial method of contacting victims, the mass mobile tower fraudsters then rely extensively on telephonic contact with a victim who had responded positively to the initial advertisement in any media. Mass mobile tower fraudsters take advantage of the human psyche and commit fraud by posing as legitimate and genuine mobile tower company.

== Authorization ==
The telecom infrastructure falls in the category of lifeline installations and BTS towers are a critical infrastructure for providing essential communication service. Companies who have been granted the Access Service License under section-4 of Indian Telegraph Act of 1885 and the companies which are registered as Infrastructure Providers under category IP-I are the only ones authorized to set up the mobile towers in country. The IP-I registered companies shall provide dark fibres, Right of Way, duct space and towers on lease, renting out, or on sale basis to the licensees of telecom services on mutually agreed terms and conditions. The access service providers can create the telecom infrastructure including telecommunication network and may provide the voice and non voice services to the customers. As of 15 December 2015, a total of 572 companies are registered under the IP-I category and 163 companies have been granted the access service license in 21 service areas. To reduce the capital expenditure, IP-1 companies and access service providers are entering into direct lease agreement with the individual property owners. The employees or representatives of the telecom company negotiates with the property owners and obtains the lease right for installation of mobile tower on the vacant land or roof top. A telecom tower company agrees to pay the monthly rent to property owners and both are entered into a long term registered lessor–lessee contract. Sometimes, family members of property owners obtain indirect benefits, such as securing the job of caretaker or security guard of the mobile towers and electric connection from the tower. These indirect benefits are normally not the part of lease agreement or terms and conditions of the contract. The mobile tower rent contracts ensure a long term rental income to the lessor (i.e., property owner) wherein the lessee (i.e., telecom tower company) enjoys the usage right for the property and provide the mobile services in the area.

== Mode of operation of mobile tower fraudsters ==
The modus operandi of the mass mobile tower fraudsters is as follows:

The fraudster uses the classified columns in print media (i.e. daily newspaper) for initial contact with the public. Some of the fraudsters have given advertisements in online classified websites and some send bulk SMS to the public. Advertisements are for seeking space for installation of mobile tower.

The fraudster uses the fake company name similar to the licensed telecom service provider and reputed Infrastructure Provider Company. Fraudsters are also seen to have their own website to prove their genuineness.

Fraudsters are not only using mobile numbers but also toll-free telephone numbers (1800) to communicate with prospective victims. The toll-free number indicates those fraudsters are increasing their communication lines to handle mass callers at a time. Fraudsters are targeting mass audience through call centres.

Once the initial contact is made by a victim with fraudsters call centre, the fraudster start working on a script having different actors, such as office staff, surveyor, engineer, advocate, government authorities, managing director and transporter. All actors play their role over mobile phones. Victims are asked to deposit small registration amount and to share the name, address and other information for installation of mobile tower. (Similar to Advance-fee scam)

In the majority of cases, victims are first informed that a surveyor or engineer would visit their land for selection and if the land is selected, the No Objection Clearance will be taken from government authorities.

In order to make victim feel more lucky, the fraudster soon informs him that the survey of their land has been done through satellite or frequency technique and there is no need of physical survey of land. In some cases, the fraudster sends a conman to meet the victim to win victim's trust at this point. In the majority of the cases, the fraudster sends a bunch of papers ranging from a copy of the mobile tower agreement, terms and conditions, forged government documents like TRAI policy and No Objection certification, transportation papers and insurance papers. These papers have a common theme of deposition of advance government tax by the victim.

The various actors of fraudster ring interacts with the victim in such a fashion that victim feels that tower company is true and companies employee are working hard to get his tower file cleared from government authorities and the advance cheque will be released shortly. The actors of the fraud ring applies the time and pressures tactics on victim so that victim should deposit the money in the fraudsters account towards fictitious charges, such as government taxes, service tax, government registration charges or clearance charges.

As soon as the money is deposited in the fraudster's account, all actors in the fraudster ring change their mobile numbers or stop answering calls from the victims.

The strategies and techniques as proposed by the National Fraud Authority can be mapped with the mass mobile tower fraud techniques as follows:

Fraudsters' Strategies to commit Fraud	Mass Mobile Tower Fraud
Victim selection strategies	Print media, online classified, SMS; Selling dreams (rental income, advance, job, vehicle, long term agreement)
Perpetration strategies	Telecalling centre; Professional, authority and legitimate appearance (use of name and logo of telecom authorities and government of India, insurance companies, use of name and logos of telecom access service providers, tower company name to sound similar to mobile tower companies) - Good sales pitch (fraud ring actors/con artist: engineer, surveyor, MD, TRAI DOT officer, advocate, transporter); Use of latest technology : Yes, relying on mobile communication, toll-free number (1800), fake websites; Intimidation : up to some extent, time pressure and coercion; Violence : No
Detection avoiding strategies	Mass target and small amount frauds, low reporting of frauds; Operates in legal hinterland : Yes, transnational offense (Interstate offense in Indian Context), Fraudster operates outside from the victims state, fraud at a distance; Procuring mobile connection and opening of bank account on fake credential basis using forged identity and address documents; Short run cycle, fraudster changes mobile numbers very frequently
Securing gains	Small amount and mass targeting; Individual bank accounts are used to secure cash transfers - Immediate withdrawal of money

== Vulnerable victims ==
The study reveals that there are large number of male victims, as India is a male-dominated society and thus their victimization risk is greater. There is no significant urban rural divide between victims, although the urban victimization rate is bit higher. With increasing age, the chances of victimization increase. The mean age of victims is 48 years. Elderly people are more susceptible to victimization. The relationship between victimization and education reveals that people having higher education (postgraduate, graduate and diploma) are more prone to mass mobile tower fraud. The notion that illiterate and primary educated people are more prone to mobile tower fraud is incorrect. The installation of mobile towers on victims' property is a source of additional income. The employment status of victims reveals that 29% of victims are working in private sector, 18% each are farmers and businesspeople, 13% are retired employees and 12% are unemployed. In rural areas, the farmers and unemployed are target whereas in urban there is a mix of employment sectors. Victim typology on the basis of financial loss reveals that there are 68% of small-scale victims who contribute only 28% of financial loss whereas the chronic victims are only 10% and contribute 47% of the loss.

== Impact of fraud ==
All victims saw an opportunity for golden business venture in the advertisement being published by mobile tower fraudsters. The advertisement are so tempting that one can not ignore them. The fraudster offers huge tower rent in the range of ₹50,000 (equivalent to ₹67,000 or US$770 in 2023) to ₹100,000 (equivalent to ₹130,000 or US$1,500 in 2023) up to the tune of more than ₹50 lakh (equivalent to ₹67 lakh or US$77,000 in 2023) and a lifetime job. There were several reasons for victims to get involved in it, such as weak financial condition, retirement settlement, surplus money and land, future planning for children, physical disability of self or dependency, unemployment, or business losses. Victims arranged the money through loan and borrowing, cash and bank savings, and provident funds. The victims of mass mobile tower fraud can be mapped to the security weakness of "the human elements" suggested by Stajano & Wilson (2009). The greed and needs of the victims made them more vulnerable to the fraud. The victims were totally focused on mobile tower installation and distract them from protecting themselves from the fraudster. The victims who are sufficiently distracted by the prospect of unexpected financial gain by mobile tower are easily persuaded by fraudsters to send money for expenses like government tax, service tax and other charges, not realizing that the entire enterprise is fraudulent. The people can not decipher the right or wrong as fraudsters alter the perception of victim using their tricks. Victims under the guise of limited time are exploited by fraudsters to make decisions they would not otherwise make, and as a result victims pass the bucks to fraudsters. The victims have suffered on account of financial loss, emotional impact including mental shock, loss of self-esteem and self-blame.

== Fraudsters – crime at a distance ==
The geographic profiling of mass mobile tower reveals that the rapid growth of telecommunication, widespread use of mobile technology and ICT use in baking business and in print media offers fraudsters an opportunity to commit crime from a distance. Geographic profiling of mass mobile tower fraud reveals that the fraud is wide spread across the country. The majority of victims are from Uttar Pradesh, West Bengal, Maharashtra and Tamil Nadu. Geographic profiling reflects that mass mobile tower fraud are transnational/interstate crime and fraud. The frauds are committed from states other than the victim's state. All the victims of Bihar, Chhattisgarh, Karnataka, Gujarat, Himachal Pradesh, Madhya Pradesh, Odisha, Punjab and West Bengal are being duped use mobile connections belonging to other states. 78% of victims in Uttar Pradesh, 83% of victims in Tamil Nadu and 88% of victims in Rajasthan are duped using mobile connections belonging to other states. Geographic profiling reflects that the frauds are being perpetrated from the north Indian states and mainly Delhi. Delhi alone has 67% of fraudsters' mobile connections, whereas Uttar Pradesh has only 13% and Haryana 10%.

== Low reporting of fraud and police action ==
The police have not taken any action in their cases and the fraudsters are untraceable. In 95% of FIR, there was no action by police or the case is closed. The police are not able to trace the accused in majority of cases. A majority of victims did not report the case to the police, whereas in some cases police did not register the FIR on victim's complaint. In the majority of cases, the victim realizes very late that they have been a victim of fraud. Some victims became aware after writing to the government ministers and authorities and by then, substantial time is lost for reporting the fraud. The police inaction in mass fraud cases also discourages the other victims to report the complaint to police. Victim perceives that police will not take any action. Many victims are reluctant to report the complaint due to guilt, as they blame themselves for the fraud. Some of the victims feel so ashamed that they even don't inform their family members about the fraud, and some victims fear that other people would laugh at them.

Small Amount and Mass Target is central to the crime and thus a victim who only deposits the registration amount make reporting less. The victim's realization that the fraudster are sitting away from them and the only information which victim are having is the mobile number and bank account number of other states, also makes victims reluctant to report the fraud. The police also do not take interest in fraud cases as the fraudsters are always located in other states. The only information available about the fraudster is the mobile phone and bank account numbers. In the majority of cases, their mobile number and bank accounts were obtained with the help of fake documents. Thus, due to difficulty in tracking a fraudster, the police loses the interest in mass mobile tower fraud cases. The complaint resolution by police in current study reveals a possibility that the police are not equipped to handle these cases and hence no action is taken in more than 90% of cases. The state police also do not have sufficient resources in other states to nab a criminal. State police need to seek prior permission or give an indication before conducting any operation in other states. The distance between the states (i.e. victim's state and offender's state) is an obstacle in the view of police in these crimes.

Sometimes victims are confused over to whom to report mobile tower fraud. It is evident from the fact that several victims wrote to the Prime Minister, Minister of Home Affairs, Finance Minister, Minister of Communication and IT, DOT, TRAI, banks etc. that the victims are directionless. The majority of victims feel that as the fraud concerns mobile towers, the Department of Telecommunications or TRAI should come to their rescue.

== Initiatives of the Department of Telecommunications, TERM Cell and TRAI ==
Public notices have been issued by Telecom Regulatory Authority of India on their website regarding mass mobile tower fraud. Telecom Enforcement, Resource and Monitoring Cells in Department of Telecommunications have also issued the public notice locally in various regional national newspapers on mass mobile tower fraud. TERM Cells are field units of Department of Telecommunications and representing the telegraph authority in the field. Government of India has set up 34 TERM Cells across India with TERM through their office located at 34 locations in India to cover all states and major cities in India. All complaints related to mobile tower fraud in the Department of Telecommunications are being sent for resolution to the respective TERM Cell located in the victim's state. TERM Cell Uttar Pradesh (West) has published the public awareness notice in past. All over India, TERM Cells in coordination with the Telecom Service providers have terminated the mobile numbers of the mobile tower fraudsters in past with objective to isolate the fraudsters from the public. TERM Cell UP (East) in coordination with Telecom Service Provider ran the fraud spread the Fraud Awareness campaign in 2013–14. Recently, the Department of Telecommunications, Government of India has instructed all the telecom service providers in the country and TERM Cells to initiate following actions on frauds related to installation of towers and seeking advance:

1. Spreading awareness among general public by publishing public notices in leading newspapers in respective areas of operation on a periodical basis.
2. Sensitizing the general public of the issue by uploading public notices on respective websites.
3. Educating subscribers of the matter by sending them SMS.
4. Where such incidences are reported, TERM Cells are asked to report this to the Superintendent/Commissioners and Director General of Police to take action on such cases wherein it is observed that name/logo of DoT has been used illegally.
