= Spanish Prisoner =

Form of confidence trick originating in the late 16th century

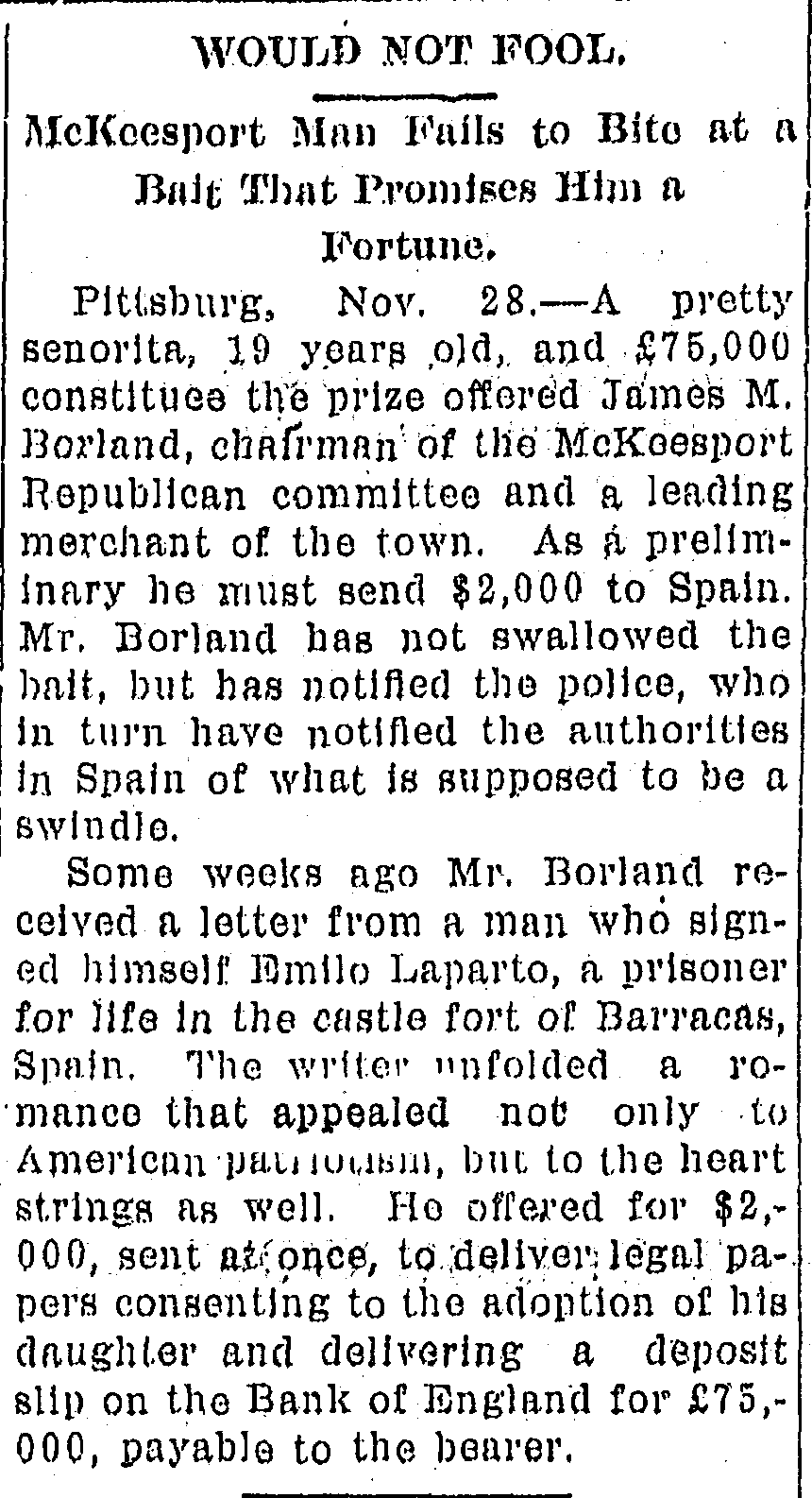
A newspaper clipping from 1904, detailing the attempted Spanish Prisoner scamming of a McKeesport, Pennsylvania man

The Spanish Prisoner is a confidence trick originating by at least the early 19th century, as Eugène François Vidocq described in his memoirs. Modern variants of the fraud include the advance-fee scam, in particular the Nigerian money transfer (or 419) scam.

== The scam ==
In its original form, the confidence trickster tells their victim (the mark) that they are (or are in contact with) a wealthy person of high estate who has been imprisoned in Spain under a false identity. Some versions said the imprisoned person was an unknown or remote relative of the mark. Supposedly the prisoner cannot reveal their identity without serious repercussions, and is relying on a friend (the trickster) to raise money to secure their release. In this classic pigeon drop game archetype, the trickster offers to let the mark put up some of the funds, with a promise of a greater monetary reward upon release of the prisoner, and sometimes the additional reward of marrying the prisoner's beautiful daughter. After the mark has turned over the funds, they are informed further difficulties have arisen, and more money is needed. With such explanations, the trickster continues to press for more money for as long as the victim can be induced to do so.
