= Nigerian Criminal Code =

The Nigerian Criminal Code is the apex codified law in Nigeria for criminal investigation, trial and punishment of criminals. It is derived from the Nigeria Criminal Code Act 1916, Nigeria Penal Code Act 1960 and other criminal laws enacted by Nigerian Parliament from time to time. The latest consolidated version of the code is contained in Nigerian Criminal Code 1990.

== Background ==
The Nigerian Criminal Code has been adapted from different laws in force in the country in different time periods since its colonial occupation by foreign governments. It includes the local African common laws and English laws borrowed from British dependencies.

== Scope and limitations ==
It may be noted that the criminal code in Nigeria does not apply uniformly to all people in all provinces of the country. Most provisions of the Nigeria Penal Code apply only to the Northern Provinces in Nigeria.
