= Lottery scam =

Fraud pretending to be a lottery

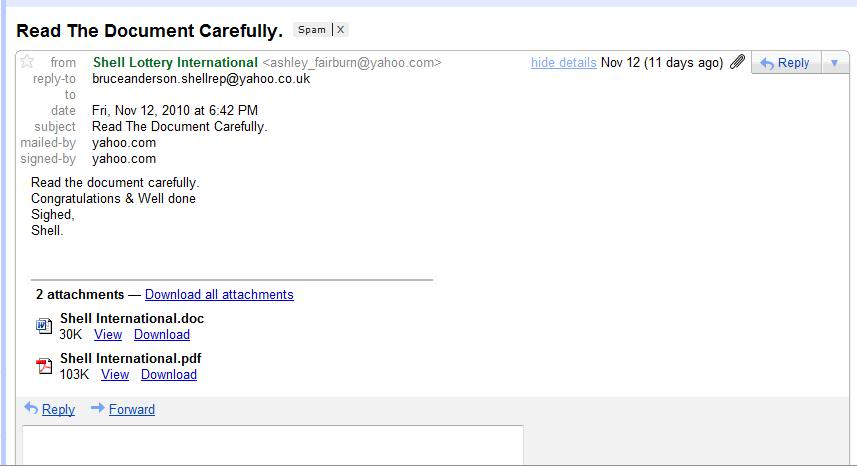
Image of lottery winner email scam

A lottery scam is a type of advance-fee fraud that begins with an unexpected message (sometimes including a fake check) stating that the victim has won a large sum of money in a lottery. The recipient of the message—the target of the scam—is usually told to keep the notice secret, "due to a mix-up in some of the names and numbers," and to contact a "claims agent." After contacting the agent, the target of the scam will be asked to pay "processing fees" or "transfer charges" so that the winnings can be distributed, but will never receive any lottery payment.

Many email lottery scams use the names of legitimate lottery organizations or other legitimate corporations/companies, but this does not mean the legitimate organizations are involved with the scams in any way.

== Identification ==
There are several ways of identifying a fake lottery email:

- Unless someone has bought a ticket, one cannot have won a prize. There are no such things as "email" draws or any other lottery where "no tickets were sold". This is simply another invention by the scammer to make the victims believe that they have won.
- The scammer will ask the victims to pay a fee in advance to receive their prize. All genuine lotteries simply subtract any fees and tax from the prize. Regardless of what the scammer claims this fee is for (such as courier charges, bank charges, or various imaginary certificates), these are all fabricated by the scammer to obtain money from victims.
- Scam lottery emails will often come from free email accounts such as Outlook, Yahoo!, Hotmail, Live, MSN, Gmail etc.
- Scam emails will often insist that the recipient keep their win confidential; this is done to avoid others advising them that the email is a scam.
- There may be inconsistencies between currencies and countries, such as for example the message being sent to an individual who lives in the UK and claiming the amount won to be in US dollars and the lottery itself to be based in South Africa.
- As with many scam email messages in general, lottery scam messages may contain spelling and/or grammatical issues.

Most email lottery scams are a type of advance fee fraud.

== Mis-selling by lottery "win" ==
Another type of lottery scam is a scam email or web page where the recipient had won a sum of money in the lottery. The recipient is instructed to contact an agent very quickly but the scammers are just using a third party company, person, email or names to hide their true identity, in some cases offering extra prizes (such as a 7 Day/6 Night Bahamas Cruise Vacation, if the user rings within 4 minutes). After contacting the "agent", the recipient will be asked to come to an office, where during one hour or more, the conditions of receiving the offer are revealed. For example, the prize recipient is encouraged to spend as much as 30 times the prize money in order to receive the prize itself. In other words, although the offer is in fact genuine, it is really only a discount of a few percent on an extremely expensive purchase. This type of scam is legal in many jurisdictions.

Sometimes lottery scam messages are sent by ordinary postal mail; their content and style is similar to the e-mail versions. For example, some scams by letter misuse the names of the legal Spanish lotteries, such as El Gordo de la Primitiva.

In the UK a number of legitimate lottery sites have dedicated pages on the subject of scams.

== Blackmail variation ==
This variation relies on the target agreeing to accept a sum of money that they know that they are not entitled to and then, when they refuse to pay the advance fee, the scammers then threaten to report them unless blackmail is paid.

A typical scenario is when the emails are sent to staff of a multinational corporation with offices/branches throughout the world using their work email address. The fraudsters will represent themselves as the agents of a scheme that the multinational has won. An example being the "winners" of a prize as a result of placing an advertisement with the supposed promoter of the scheme in an obscure (and sometimes fictional) trade magazine published in an equally obscure country. The scammers will allege that they have written to the corporation's headquarters and made every attempt to pass on the "prize" but without success, but as they (the scammers) don't want to lose face with the promoters they are anxious to discharge their responsibilities to pass on the prize money, they will ask for the target's personal banking details to allow the "prize" to be sent and trust the target to pass it on to their employers. This immediately makes the target vulnerable to a phishing attack but, more significantly, to blackmail attempts. When they refuse to pay any advance fee the fraudsters threaten to report the matter to their employers and/or the police.

== Statistics ==
The FBI's Internet Crime Complaint Center (IC3) counts lottery scams in a single category with sweepstakes and inheritance fraud. The category covers cases where someone is told they have won a lottery or sweepstakes they did not enter. The IC3 recorded 5,623 complaints in this category in 2025, with reported losses of $194,147,851. In 2024 it recorded 3,690 complaints and $102,212,250 in losses.
