= Advance-fee scam =

Type of confidence trick fraud

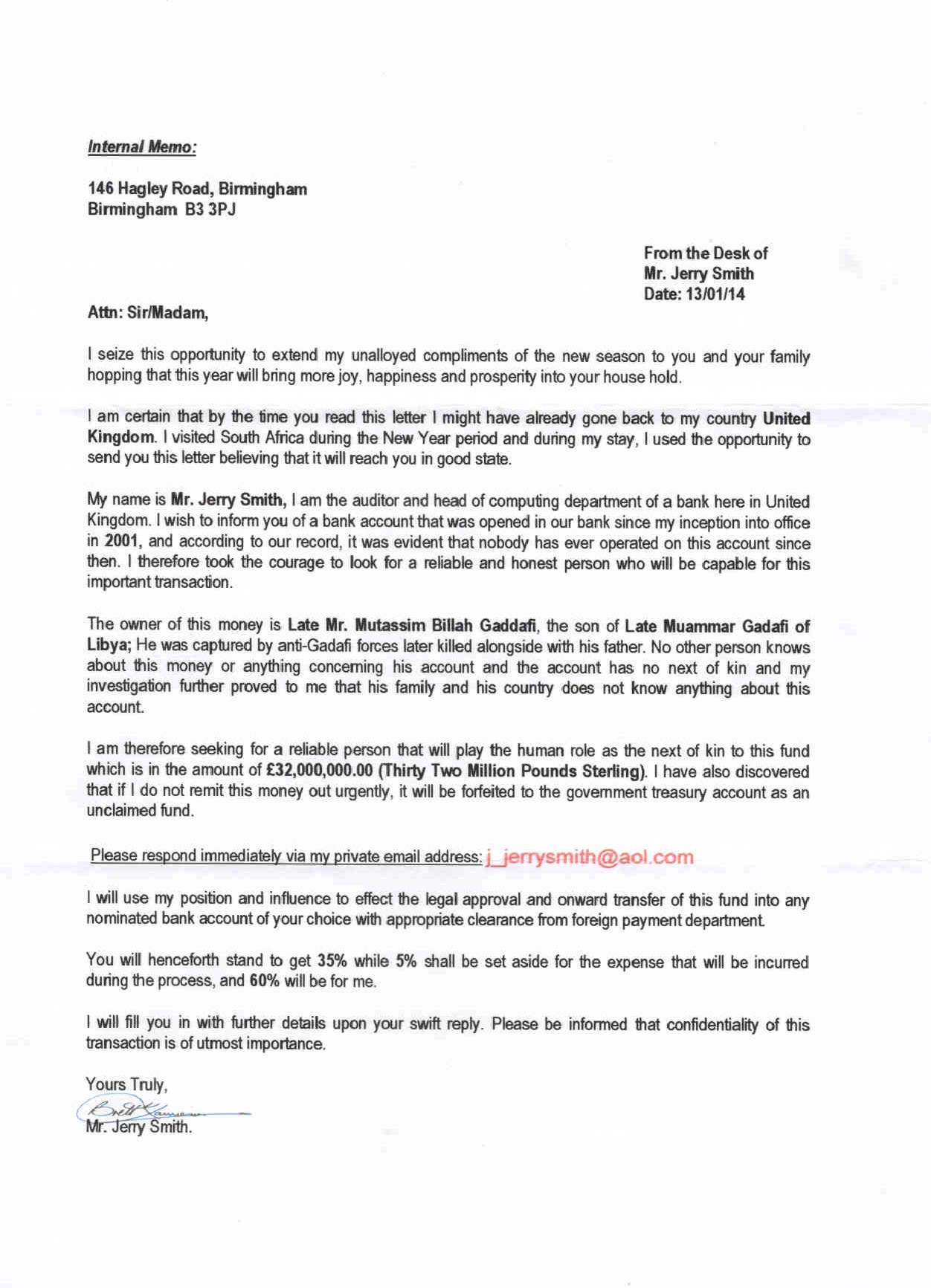
Scam letter posted within South Africa

An advance-fee scam is a form of fraud and is a common scam. The scam works by promising the victim a large sum of money in return for a small upfront payment, which the fraudster claims will be used to obtain the large sum. If a victim makes the payment, the fraudster either invents a series of further fees for the victim to pay or simply disappears.

The Federal Bureau of Investigation (FBI) states that "An advance fee scheme occurs when the victim pays money to someone in anticipation of receiving something of greater value – such as a loan, contract, investment, or gift – and then receives little or nothing in return." There are many variations of this type of scam, including the Nigerian prince scam, also known as a 419 scam. The number "419" refers to the section of the Nigerian Criminal Code dealing with fraud. It is popularly known as "yahoo yahoo" in Nigeria. The scam has been used with fax and traditional mail and is now prevalent in online communications such as emails. Other variations include the Spanish Prisoner scam and the black money scam.

Although Nigeria is most often the nation referred to in these scams, they mainly originate in other nations. Other nations known to have a high incidence of advance-fee fraud include Ivory Coast, Togo, South Africa, the Netherlands, Spain, and Jamaica.

== History ==
The modern scam is similar to the Spanish Prisoner scam that dates back to the late 18th century. In that con, businessmen were contacted by an individual allegedly trying to smuggle someone who is connected to a wealthy family out of a prison in Spain. The scammer promised to share money with the victim in exchange for a small amount of money to bribe prison guards.

One variant of the scam may date back to the 18th or 19th century, as a very similar letter, entitled "The Letter from Jerusalem". This is illustrated in the memoirs of Eugène François Vidocq, a former French criminal and private investigator. Another variant of the scam, dating back to ca. 1830, appears very similar to emails today: "Sir, you will doubtlessly be astonished to be receiving a letter from a person unknown to you, who is about to ask a favour from you..." and goes on to talk of a casket containing 16,000 francs in gold and the diamonds of a late marchioness.

The modern-day transnational scam can be traced back to Germany in 1922 and became popular during the 1980s. There are many variants of the template letter. One of these, sent via postal mail, was addressed to a woman's husband to inquire about his health. It then asked what to do with profits from a $24.6 million investment and ended with a telephone number.

Other official-looking letters were sent from a writer who said he was a director of the state-owned Nigerian National Petroleum Corporation. He said he wanted to transfer $20 million to the recipient's bank account—money that was budgeted but was never spent. In exchange for transferring the funds out of Nigeria, the recipient would keep 30% of the total. To get the process started, the scammer asked for a few sheets of the company's letterhead, bank account numbers, and other personal information. Yet other variants have involved mention of a Nigerian prince or other member of a royal family seeking to transfer large sums of money out of the country—thus, these scams are sometimes called "Nigerian Prince emails".

The spread of e-mail and email harvesting software significantly lowered the cost of sending scam letters by using the Internet in lieu of international post. Although Nigeria is most often the nation referred to in these scams, they may originate in other nations as well. For example, in 2007, the head of the Economic and Financial Crimes Commission stated that scam emails more frequently originated in African countries or in Eastern Europe. Within the European Union, there is a high incidence of advance-fee fraud in the Netherlands and Spain.

The emails sent invariably feature a large number of implausible claims, as well as numerous spelling and grammatical mistakes. According to Cormac Herley, a Microsoft researcher, "By sending an email that repels all but the most gullible, the scammer gets the most promising marks to self-select." Responding to Herley, a director at Nigeria's National Security Adviser said that there are more non-Nigerian scammers claiming to be Nigerian, and suggested that Nigeria's reputation for corruption is part of the allure that makes scams seem more plausible. Nigeria has a reputation for being at the center of email scamming.

Modern variations include “sugar daddy/sugar momma” schemes, some of which involve advance-fee scamming, and money flipping, whereby the mark is promised a large amount of money in exchange for sending a small amount of money.

A 2018 study of Nigerian hip-hop culture found that glamorization of cyber-fraud is prevalent in such music. Some scammers have accomplices in the United States and abroad who move in to finish the deal once the initial contact has been made.

=== Motives ===
Many scammers tend to come from poorer and more-educated backgrounds, where Internet access and better education, along with inability to afford basic necessities, drive people into committing online fraud. They could also have been influenced by social media celebrities and artists who promote scamming as a "cool" trend to quickly gain access to luxury items like sports cars and fashion.

In the case of Nigeria, the rise in scamming cases was due to a boom in cybercafes, a series of economic crashes from the 1980s, and the resulting joblessness among young people in Nigeria.

== Implementation ==
This scam usually begins with the perpetrator contacting the victim via email, instant messaging, or social media using a fake email address or a fake social media account. The fraudster then makes an offer that would allegedly result in a large payoff for the victim. An email subject line may say something like "From the desk of barrister [Name]", "Your assistance is needed", "Important", "Dear Sir or Madam" and so on. The details vary, but the usual story is that a person, often a government or bank employee, knows of a large amount of unclaimed money or gold that they cannot access directly, usually because they have no right to it.

Such people, who may be real people being impersonated by the scammer or fictitious characters played by the con artist, could include, for example, the wife or son of a deposed African leader who has amassed a stolen fortune, a bank employee who knows of a terminally ill wealthy person with no relatives or a wealthy foreigner who deposited money in the bank just before dying in a traffic accident or a plane crash (leaving no will or known next of kin), a US soldier who has stumbled upon a hidden cache of gold in Iraq, a business being audited by the government, a disgruntled worker or corrupt government official who has embezzled funds, a refugee, and similar characters.

The money could be in the form of gold bullion, gold dust, money in a bank account, blood diamonds, a series of cheques or bank drafts, and so on. The sums involved are usually in the millions of dollars, and the investor is promised a large share, typically ten to fifty percent, in return for assisting the fraudster to retrieve or expatriate the money. Although the vast majority of recipients do not respond to these emails, a small percentage do, enough to make the scam worthwhile as many millions of messages can be sent daily.

To help persuade the victim to agree to the deal, the scammer often sends one or more false documents that bear official government stamps, and seals. 419 scammers also often utilize fake websites and addresses to present themselves as more legitimate. Multiple "people" may write or be involved in schemes as they continue, but they are often fictitious; in many cases, one person controls all the fictitious personae used in scams.

Once the victim's confidence has been gained, the scammer then introduces a delay or monetary hurdle that prevents the deal from occurring as planned, such as "To transmit the money, we need to bribe a bank official. Could you help us with a loan?" or "For you to be a party to the transaction, you must have holdings at a Nigerian bank of $100,000 or more" or similar. This is the money being stolen from the victim; the victim willingly transfers the money, usually through some irreversible channel such as a wire transfer, and the scammer receives and pockets it.

Often but not always, delays and additional costs are added by the fraudster, always keeping the promise of an imminent large transfer alive, convincing the victim that the money the victim is currently paying would be covered several times over by the payoff. The implication that these payments will be used for white-collar crime, such as bribery, and even that the money they are being promised is being stolen from a government or royal/wealthy family, often prevents the victim from telling others about the "transaction", as it would involve admitting that they intended to be complicit in an international crime.

Sometimes psychological pressure is added by claiming that the scammers' side, to pay certain fees, had to sell belongings and mortgage a house or by comparing the salary scale and living conditions in their country to those in the West. Much of the time, however, the needed psychological pressure is self-applied: once the victims have provided money toward the payoff, they feel they have a vested interest in seeing the "deal" through. Some victims even believe they can cheat the other party, and walk away with all the money instead of just the percentage they were promised.

The essential fact in all advance-fee fraud operations is that the promised money transfer to the victim never happens because the money does not exist. The perpetrators rely on the fact that, by the time the victim realizes this (often only after being confronted by a third party who has noticed the transactions or conversation and recognized the scam), the victim may have sent thousands of dollars of their own money, sometimes thousands more that was borrowed or stolen, to the scammer via an untraceable and/or irreversible means such as wire transfer. The scammer disappears, and the victim is left on the hook for the money sent to the scammer.

During the course of many schemes, scammers ask victims to supply bank account information. Usually this is a "test" devised by the scammer to gauge the victim's gullibility; the bank account information is not used directly by the scammer, because a fraudulent withdrawal from the account is more easily detected, reversed, and traced. Scammers instead usually request that payments be made using a wire transfer service like Western Union and MoneyGram. The reason given by the scammer usually relates to the speed at which the payment can be received and processed, allowing quick release of the supposed payoff. The real reason for using such money-sending services is that such wire transfers are irreversible and often untraceable. Further, these services are ideal because identification beyond knowledge of the details of the transaction is often not required, making receipt of such funds almost or entirely anonymous. However, bank account information obtained by scammers is sometimes sold in bulk to other fraudsters who wait a few months for the victim to repair the damage caused by the initial scam before raiding any accounts that the victim did not close.

Telephone numbers used by scammers tend to come from burner phones. In Ivory Coast, a scammer may purchase an inexpensive mobile phone and a pre-paid SIM card without submitting any identifying information. If the scammers believe they are being traced, they discard their mobile phones and purchase new ones.

The spam emails used in these scams are often sent from Internet cafés equipped with satellite internet connection. Recipient addresses and email content are copied and pasted into a webmail interface using a stand-alone storage medium, such as a memory card. Certain areas of Lagos, such as Festac Town, contain many cyber cafés that serve scammers; cyber cafés often lock their doors during certain times, e.g., between 10:30 p.m. and 7:00 a.m., so that scammers inside may work without fear of discovery.

Nigeria also contains many businesses that provide false documents used in scams. After a scam involving a forged signature of Nigerian President Olusegun Obasanjo in summer 2005, Nigerian authorities raided a market in the Oluwole section of Lagos. There, police seized thousands of Nigerian and non-Nigerian passports, 10,000 blank British Airways boarding passes, 10,000 United States Postal money orders, customs documents, false university certificates, 500 printing plates, and 500 computers.

The "success rate" of the scammers is also hard to gauge, since they operate illegally and do not keep track of specific numbers. One individual estimated that he sent 500 emails per day and received about seven replies, citing that when he received a reply, he was 70 percent certain he would get the money. If tens of thousands of emails are sent every day by thousands of individuals, it does not take a very high success rate to be worthwhile.

The success of advance fee crimes is based on the initial persuading of the victim. In its annual report for 2025, the FBI's Internet Crime Complaint Center recorded 7,762 complaints of advance-fee fraud, with reported losses of $155,910,852.

== Countermeasures ==
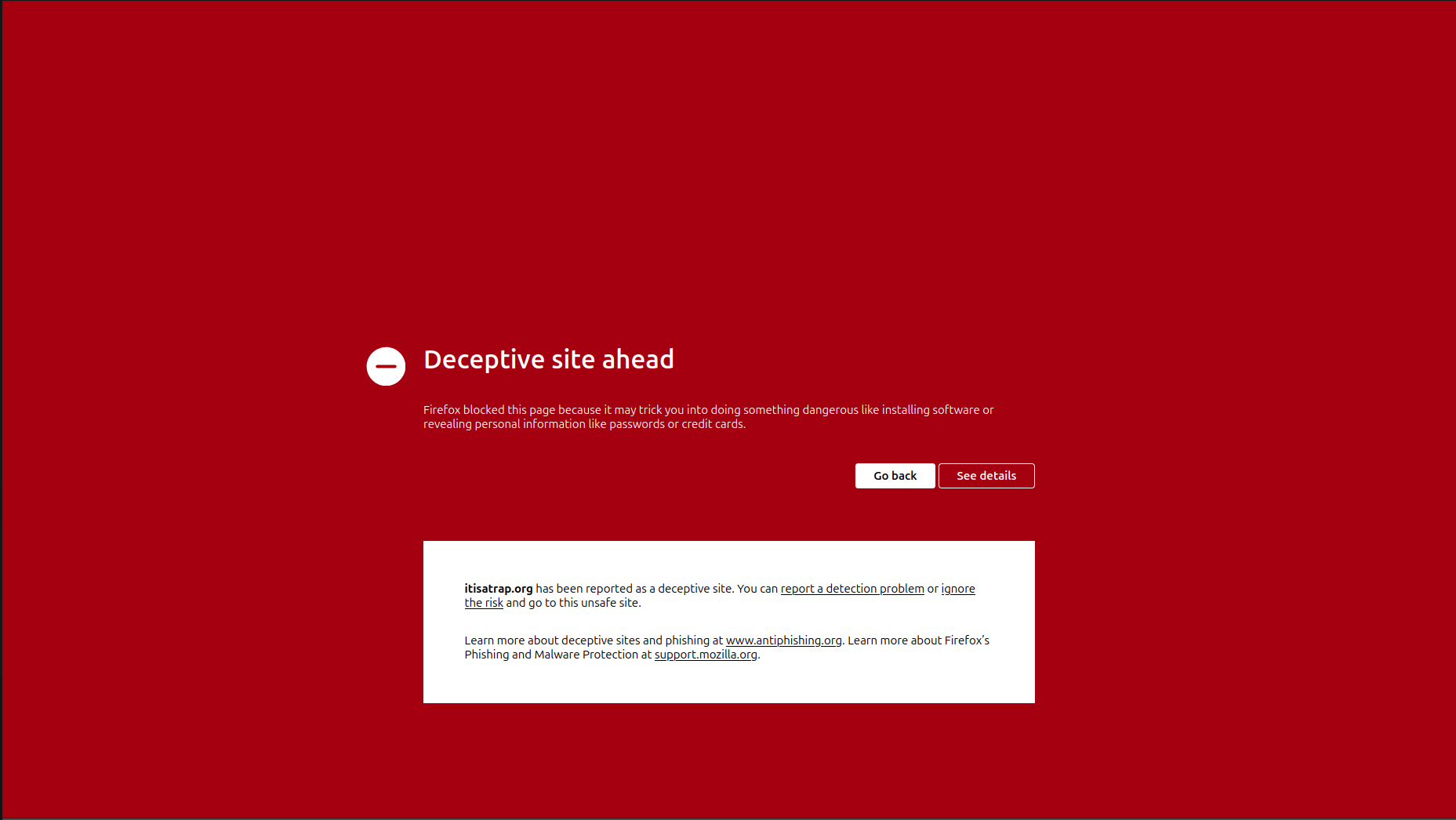
Screenshot of a deceptive site warning in the Firefox browser

In recent years, efforts have been made by governments, internet companies, and individuals to combat scammers involved in advance-fee fraud and 419 scams. In 2004, the Nigerian government formed the Economic and Financial Crimes Commission (EFCC) to combat economic and financial crimes, such as advanced-fee fraud. In 2009, Nigeria's EFCC announced that they had adopted smart technology developed by Microsoft to track down fraudulent emails. They hoped to have the service, dubbed "Eagle Claw", running at full capacity to warn a quarter of a million potential victims.

Some individuals participate in a practice known as scam baiting, in which they pose as potential targets and engage the scammers in lengthy dialogue so as to waste the scammer's time and decrease the time they have available for actual victims. Likewise, the website Artists Against 419, set up by volunteers, offers a public database with information on scam websites. They work closely together with APWG to share their data with financial institutions and cybersecurity companies.

== Common elements ==
=== Irreversible money transfers ===
A central element of advance-fee fraud is that the transaction from the victim to the scammer must be untraceable and irreversible. Otherwise, the victim, once they become aware of the scam, could successfully retrieve their money and alert officials who could track the accounts used by the scammer.

Cryptocurrencies or wire transfers via Western Union and MoneyGram are ideal for this purpose. International wire transfers cannot be cancelled or reversed, and the person receiving the money cannot be tracked. Other non-cancellable forms of payment include postal money orders and cashier's cheques, but wire transfer via Western Union or MoneyGram is more common.

=== Anonymous communication ===
Since the scammer's operations must be untraceable to avoid identification, and because the scammer is often impersonating someone else, any communication between the scammer and his victim must be done through channels that hide the scammer's true identity. The following options in particular are widely used.

==== Web-based email ====
Because many free email services do not require valid identifying information and also allow communication with many victims in a short span of time, they are the preferred method of communication for scammers. Some services go so far as to mask the sender's source IP address (Gmail being a common choice), making the scammer's country of origin more difficult to trace. While Gmail does indeed strip headers from emails, it is possible to trace an IP address from such an email. Scammers can create as many accounts as they wish and often have several at a time. In addition, if email providers are alerted to the scammer's activities and suspend the account, it is a trivial matter for the scammer to simply create a new account to resume scamming.

==== Email hijacking/friend scams ====
Some fraudsters hijack existing email accounts and use them for advance-fee fraud purposes. For instance, with social engineering, the fraudster impersonates associates, friends, or family members of the legitimate account owner in an attempt to defraud them. A variety of techniques such as phishing, keyloggers, and computer viruses are used to gain login information for the email address.

==== Fax transmissions ====
Facsimile machines are commonly used tools of business whenever a client requires a hard copy of a document. They can also be simulated using web services and made untraceable by the use of prepaid phones connected to mobile fax machines or by use of a public fax machine such as one owned by a document processing business like FedEx Office/Kinko's. Thus, scammers posing as business entities often use fax transmissions as an anonymous form of communication. This is more expensive, as the prepaid phone and fax equipment cost more than email, but to a skeptical victim, it can be more believable.

==== SMS messages ====
Abusing SMS bulk senders such as WASPs, scammers subscribe to these services using fraudulent registration details and paying either via cash or with stolen credit card details. They then send out masses of unsolicited SMS messages to victims stating they have won a competition, lottery, reward, or an event and that they have to contact somebody to claim their prize. Typically, the details of the party to be contacted will be an equally untraceable email address or a virtual telephone number.

These messages may be sent over a weekend when the staff at the service providers are not working, enabling the scammer to be able to abuse the services for a whole weekend. Even when traceable, they give out long and winding procedures for procuring the reward (real or unreal) and that too with the impending huge cost of transportation and tax or duty charges. The origin of such SMS messages is often from fake websites/addresses.

Mid-2011 saw the innovation of scammers employing premium rate callback numbers for potential victims to reply to (rather than providing a website or email address). On calling the number, the victim is first reassured that 'they are a winner' and then subjected to a long series of instructions on how to collect their 'winnings'. During the message, there will be frequent instructions to 'ring back in the event of problems'. The call is always 'cut off' just before the victim has the chance to note all the details. Some victims call back multiple times in an effort to collect all the details. The scammer thus makes their money out of the fees charged for the calls.

==== Telecommunications relay services ====
Many scams use telephone calls to convince the victim that the person on the other end of the deal is a real, truthful person. The scammer, possibly impersonating a person of a nationality or gender other than their own, would arouse suspicion by telephoning the victim. In these cases, scammers use TRS, a US federally funded relay service where an operator or a text/speech translation program acts as an intermediary between someone using an ordinary telephone and a deaf caller using TDD or other teleprinter device. The scammer may claim they are deaf, and that they must use a relay service. The victim, possibly drawn in by sympathy for a disabled caller, might be more susceptible to the fraud.

FCC regulations and confidentiality laws require operators to relay calls verbatim and adhere to a strict code of confidentiality and ethics. Thus, no relay operator may judge the legality and legitimacy of a relay call and must relay it without interference. This means the relay operator may not warn victims, even when they suspect the call is a scam. MCI said about one percent of their IP Relay calls in 2004 were scams.

Tracking phone-based relay services is relatively easy, so scammers tend to prefer Internet Protocol–based relay services such as IP Relay. In a common strategy, they bind their overseas IP address to a router or server located on US soil, allowing them to use US-based relay service providers without interference.

TRS is sometimes used to relay credit card information to make a fraudulent purchase with a stolen credit card. In many cases however, it is simply a means for the con artist to further lure the victim into the scam.

=== Invitation to visit the country ===
Sometimes, victims are invited to a country to meet government officials, an associate of the scammer, or the scammer themselves. Some victims who travel are instead held for ransom. Scammers may tell a victim that they do not need a visa or that the scammers will provide one. If the victim does this, the scammers have the power to extort money from the victim.

Sometimes victims are ransomed, kidnapped, or murdered. According to a 1995 U.S. State Department report, over fifteen persons were murdered between 1992 and 1995 in Nigeria after following through on advance-fee frauds. In 1999 Norwegian millionaire Kjetil Moe was lured to South Africa by scammers and was murdered. George Makronalli was lured to South Africa and was killed in 2004.

== Variants ==
There are many variations on the most common stories, and also many variations on the way the scam works. Some of the more commonly seen variants involve employment scams, lottery scams, online sales and rentals, and romance scams. Many scams involve online sales, such as those advertised on websites such as Craigslist and eBay, or property rental. This article cannot list every known and future type of advanced fee fraud or 419 scheme; only some major types are described. Additional examples may be available in the external links section at the end of this article.

=== Employment scams ===
This scam targets people who have posted their résumés on job sites. The scammer sends a letter with a falsified company logo. The job offer usually indicates exceptional salary and benefits, and requests that the victim needs a "work permit" for working in the country, and includes the address of a (fake) "government official" to contact. The "government official" then proceeds to fleece the victim by extracting fees from the unsuspecting user for the work permit and other fees. A variant of the job scam recruits freelancers seeking work, such as editing or translation, then requires some advance payment before assignments are offered.

Many legitimate (or at least fully registered) companies work on a similar basis, using this method as their primary source of earnings. Some modelling and escort agencies tell applicants that they have a number of clients lined up, but that they require some sort of prior "registration fee", usually paid in by an untraceable method, e.g. by Western Union transfer; once the fee is paid, the applicant is informed the client has cancelled, and not contacted again.

The scammer contacts the victim to interest them in a "work-from-home" opportunity, or asks them to cash a cheque or money order that for some reason cannot be redeemed locally. In one cover story, the perpetrator of the scam wishes the victim to work as a "mystery shopper", evaluating the service provided by MoneyGram or Western Union locations within major retailers such as Wal-Mart. The scammer sends the victim a forged or stolen cheque or money order as described above, the victim deposits it—banks will often credit an account with the value of a cheque not obviously false— and sends the money to the scammer via wire transfer. Later the cheque is not honoured ("bounces") and the bank debits the victim's account. Schemes based solely on cheque cashing usually offer only a small part of the cheque's total amount, with the assurance that many more cheques will follow; if the victim buys into the scam and cashes all the cheques, the scammer can steal a lot in a very short time.

==== Bogus job offers ====
More sophisticated scams advertise jobs with real companies and offer lucrative salaries and conditions with the fraudsters pretending to be recruitment agents. A bogus telephone or online interview may take place and after some time the applicant is informed that the job is theirs. To secure the job they are instructed to send money for their work visa or travel costs to the agent, or to a bogus travel agent who works on the scammer's behalf. No matter what the variation, they always involve the job seeker sending them or their agent money, credit card or bank account details. A newer form of employment scam has arisen in which users are sent a bogus job offer but are not asked to give financial information. Instead, their personal information is harvested during the application process and then sold to third parties for a profit, or used for identity theft.

Another form of employment scam involves making people attend a fake "interview" where they are told the benefits of the company. The attendees are then made to assist to a conference where a scammer will use elaborate manipulation techniques to convince the attendees to purchase products, in a similar manner to the catalog merchant business model, as a hiring requisite. Quite often, the company lacks any form of the physical catalog to help them sell products (e.g. jewelry). When "given" the job, the individual is then asked to promote the scam job offer on their own. They are also made to work for the company unpaid as a form of "training". Similar scams involve making alleged job candidates pay money upfront in person for training materials or services, with the claim that upon successful completion, they will be offered a guaranteed job, which never materializes.

=== Lottery scam ===
The lottery scam involves fake notices of lottery wins, although the intended victim has not entered the lottery. The "winner" is usually asked to send sensitive information such as name, residential address, occupation/position, lottery number etc. to a free email account which is at times untraceable or without any link. In addition to harvesting this information, the scammer then notifies the victim that releasing the funds requires some small fee (insurance, registration, or shipping). Once the victim sends the fee, the scammer invents another fee.

The fake cheque technique described above is also used. Fake or stolen cheque, representing a part payment of the winnings, being sent; then a fee, smaller than the amount received, is requested. The bank receiving the bad cheque eventually reclaims the funds from the victim.

In 2004, a variant of the lottery scam appeared in the United States: a scammer phones a victim purporting to be speaking on behalf of the government about a grant they qualify for, subject to an advance fee of typically US$250.

Typical lottery scams address the person as some variation of Lucky Winner. This is a red flag, as if someone entered an actual lottery and won, the organization would know their name, and not simply call them Lucky Winner.

=== Online sales and rentals ===
Many scams involve the purchase of goods and services via classified advertisements, especially on sites like Craigslist, eBay, or Gumtree. These typically involve the scammer contacting the seller of a particular good or service via telephone or email expressing interest in the item. They will typically then send a fake cheque written for an amount greater than the asking price, asking the seller to send the difference to an alternate address, usually by money order or Western Union. A seller eager to sell a particular product may not wait for the cheque to clear, and when the bad cheque bounces, the funds wired have already been lost.

Some scammers advertise phony academic conferences in exotic or international locations, complete with fake websites, scheduled agendas and advertising experts in a particular field that will be presenting there. They offer to pay the airfare of the participants, but not the hotel accommodations. They will extract money from the victims when they attempt to reserve their accommodations in a non-existent hotel.

Sometimes, an inexpensive rental property is advertised by a fake landlord, who is typically out of state (or the country) and asking for the rent and/or deposit to be wired to them. Or the con artist finds a property, pretends to be the owner, lists it online, and communicates with the would-be renter to make a cash deposit. The scammer may also be the renter as well, in which case they pretend to be a foreign student and contact a landlord seeking accommodation. They usually state they are not yet in the country and wish to secure accommodations prior to arriving. Once the terms are negotiated, a forged cheque is forwarded for a greater amount than negotiated, and the fraudster asks the landlord to wire some of the money back.

=== Pet scams ===
This is a variation of the online sales scam where high-value, scarce pets are advertised as bait on online advertising websites using little real seller verification like Craigslist, Gumtree, and JunkMail. The pet may either be advertised as being for-sale or up for adoption. Typically, the pet is advertised on online advertising pages complete with photographs taken from various sources such as real advertisements, blogs or wherever else an image can be stolen. Upon the potential victim contacting the scammer, the scammer responds by asking for details pertaining to the potential victim's circumstances and location under the pretense of ensuring that the pet would have a suitable home.

By determining the location of the victim, the scammer ensures he is far enough from the victim so as to not allow the buyer to physically view the pet. Should the scammer be questioned, as the advertisement claimed a location initially, the scammer will claim work circumstances having forced him to relocate. This forces a situation whereby all communication is either via email, telephone (normally untraceable numbers) and SMS.

Upon the victim deciding to adopt or purchase the pet, a courier has to be used which is in reality part of the scam. If this is for an adopted pet, typically the victim is expected to pay some fee such as insurance, food or shipping. Payment is via MoneyGram, Western Union or money mules' bank accounts where other victims have been duped into work from home scams.

Numerous problems are encountered in the courier phase of the scam. The crate may be said to be too small, and the victim has the option of either purchasing a crate with air conditioning or renting one while also paying a deposit, typically called a caution or cautionary fee. The victim may also have to pay for insurance if such fees have not been paid yet. If the victim pays these fees, the pet may be said to have become sick, and a veterinarian's assistance is sought for which the victim has to repay the courier.

Additionally, the victim may be asked to pay for a health certificate needed to transport the pet, and for kennel fees during the recuperation period. The further the scam progresses, the more similar the fictitious fees are to those of typical 419 scams. It is not uncommon to see customs or like fees being claimed if such charges fit into the scam plot.

Numerous scam websites may be used for this scam. This scam has been linked to the classical 419 scams in that the fictitious couriers used are also used in other types of 419 scams such as lotto scams.

=== Romance scam ===
One of the variants is the Romance Scam, a money-for-romance angle. The con artist approaches the victim on an online dating service, an instant messenger, or a social networking site. The scammer claims an interest in the victim, and posts pictures of an attractive person. The scammer uses this communication to gain confidence, then asks for money. A very common example of romance scams is depicted in the fraudulent activities of these boys, popularly known as Yahoo boys in Nigeria.

The con artist may claim to be interested in meeting the victim but needs cash to book a plane, buy a bus ticket, rent a hotel room, pay for personal-travel costs such as gasoline or a vehicle rental, or to cover other expenses. In other cases, they claim they are trapped in a foreign country and need assistance to return, to escape imprisonment by corrupt local officials, to pay for medical expenses due to an illness contracted abroad, and so on. The scammer may also use the confidence gained by the romance angle to introduce some variant of the original Nigerian Letter scheme, such as saying they need to get money or valuables out of the country and offer to share the wealth, making the request for help in leaving the country even more attractive to the victim.

Scams often involve meeting someone on an online match-making service. The scammer initiates contact with their target who is out of the area and requests money for transportation fare. Scammers will typically ask for money to be sent via a money order or wire transfer due to the need to travel, or for medical or business costs.

An extreme example of this is the case of a 67-year-old Australian woman, Jette Jacobs. In 2013, she traveled to South Africa to supposedly marry her scammer, Jesse Orowo Omokoh, 28, after having sent more than $90,000 to him over a three-year period. Her body was discovered on February 9, 2013, under mysterious circumstances, two days after meeting up with Omokoh, who then fled to Nigeria, where he was arrested. He was found to have had 32 fake online identities. Due to lack of evidence he was not charged with murder, but was charged with fraud.

=== Mobile tower installation fraud ===
This variant of advance-fee fraud is widespread in India and Pakistan. The fraudster uses Internet classified websites and print media to lure the public into installing a mobile phone tower on their property, with the promise of huge rental returns. The fraudster also creates fake websites to appear legitimate. The victims part with their money in pieces to the fraudster on account of the Government Service Tax, government clearance charges, bank charges, transportation charges, survey fee etc. The Indian government is issuing public notices in media to spread awareness among the public and warn them against mobile tower fraudsters.

=== Other scams ===
Other scams involve unclaimed property, also called "bona vacantia" in the United Kingdom. In England and Wales (other than the Duchy of Lancaster and the Duchy of Cornwall), this property is administered by the Bona Vacantia Division of the Treasury Solicitor's Department. Fraudulent emails and letters claiming to be from this department have been reported, informing the recipient they are the beneficiary of a legacy but requiring the payment of a fee before sending more information or releasing the money. In the United States, messages are falsely claimed to be from the National Association of Unclaimed Property Administrators (NAUPA), a real organization, but one that does not and cannot by itself make payments.

In one variant of 419 fraud, an alleged hitman writes to someone explaining he has been targeted to kill them. He tells them he knows the allegations against them are false, and asks for money so the target can receive evidence of the person who ordered the hit.

Another variant of advanced fee fraud is known as a pigeon drop. This is a confidence trick in which the mark, or "pigeon", is persuaded to give up a sum of money in order to secure the rights to a larger sum of money, or more valuable object. In reality, the scammers make off with the money and the mark is left with nothing. In the process, the stranger (actually a confidence trickster) puts his money with the mark's money (in an envelope, briefcase, or bag) which the mark is then apparently entrusted with; it is actually switched for a bag full of newspaper or other worthless material. Through various theatrics, the mark is given the opportunity to leave with the money without the stranger realizing. In reality, the mark would be fleeing from his own money, which the con man still has (or has handed off to an accomplice).

Some scammers go after the victims of previous scams; known as a reloading scam. For example, they may contact a victim saying they can track and apprehend the scammer and recover the money lost by the victim for a price. Or they may say a fund has been set up by the Nigerian government to compensate victims of 419 fraud, and all that is required is proof of the loss, personal information, and a processing and handling fee. The recovery scammers obtain lists of victims by buying them from the original scammers.

== Consequences ==
Estimates of the total losses due to scams are uncertain and vary widely, since many people may be too embarrassed to admit that they were gullible enough to be scammed to report the crime. A United States government report in 2006 indicated that Americans lost $198.4 million to Internet fraud in 2006, averaging a loss of $5,100 per incident. That same year, a report in the United Kingdom claimed that these scams cost the economy £150 million per year, with the average victim losing £31,000. As of 2019, Nigerian letter scams still annually collect $700,000 ($881,492 in 2025 dollars) or $2,133 ($2,686 in 2025 dollars) per person.

In addition to the financial cost, many victims also suffer a severe emotional and psychological cost, such as losing their ability to trust people. One man from Cambridgeshire, UK burnt himself to death with petrol after realizing that the $1.2 million "internet lottery" that he had won was actually a scam. In 2007, a Chinese student at the University of Nottingham killed herself after she discovered that she had fallen for a similar lottery scam.

Other victims lose wealth and friends, become estranged from family members, deceive partners, get divorced, or commit criminal offenses in the process of either fulfilling their "obligations" to the scammers or obtaining more money. In 2008, an Oregon woman lost $400,000 to a Nigerian advance-fee fraud scam, after an email told her she had inherited money from her long-lost grandfather. Her curiosity was piqued because she actually had a grandfather with whom her family had lost touch, and whose initials matched those given in the email. She sent hundreds of thousands of dollars over a period of more than two years, despite her family, bank staff and law enforcement officials all urging her to stop. The elderly are particularly susceptible to online scams such as this, as they typically come from a generation that was more trusting, and are often too proud to report the fraud. They also may be concerned that relatives might see it as a sign of declining mental capacity, and they are afraid to lose their independence.

Victims can be enticed to borrow or embezzle money to pay the advance fees, believing that they will shortly be paid a much larger sum and be able to refund what they had misappropriated. Crimes committed by victims include credit-card fraud, check kiting, and embezzlement. San Diego–based businessman James Adler lost over $5 million in a Nigeria-based advance-fee scam. While a court affirmed that various Nigerian government officials (including a governor of the Central Bank of Nigeria) were directly or indirectly involved, and that Nigerian government officials could be sued in U.S. courts under the "commercial activity" exception to the Foreign Sovereign Immunities Act, Adler was unable to get his money back due to the doctrine of unclean hands because he had knowingly entered into a contract that was illegal.

Some 419 scams involve even more serious crimes, such as kidnapping or murder. One such case, in 2008, involves Osamai Hitomi, a Japanese businessman who was lured to Johannesburg, South Africa and kidnapped on September 26, 2008. The kidnappers took him to Alberton, south of Johannesburg, and demanded a $5 million ransom from his family. Seven people were ultimately arrested. In July 2001, Joseph Raca, a former mayor of Northampton, UK, was kidnapped by scammers in Johannesburg, South Africa, who demanded a ransom of £20,000. The captors released Raca after they became nervous. One 419 scam that ended in murder occurred in February 2003, when Jiří Pasovský, a 72-year-old scam victim from the Czech Republic, shot and killed 50-year-old Michael Lekara Wayid, an official at the Nigerian embassy in Prague, and injured another person, after the Nigerian Consul General explained he could not return the $600,000 that Pasovský had lost to a Nigerian scammer.

The international nature of the crime, combined with the fact that many victims do not want to admit that they bought into an illegal activity, has made tracking down and apprehending these criminals difficult. Furthermore, the government of Nigeria has been slow to take action, leading some investigators to believe that some Nigerian government officials are involved in some of these scams. The Nigeria government's establishment of the Economic and Financial Crimes Commission (EFCC) in 2004 helped with the issue to some degree, although issues with corruption remain.

Despite this, there have been some recent successes in apprehending and prosecuting these criminals. In 2004, 52 suspects were arrested in Amsterdam after an extensive raid, after which almost no 419 emails were reported being sent by local internet service providers. In November 2004, Australian authorities apprehended Nick Marinellis of Sydney, the self-proclaimed head of Australian 419ers who later boasted that he had "220 African brothers worldwide" and that he was "the Australian headquarters for those scams". In 2008 US authorities in Olympia, Washington, sentenced Edna Fiedler to two years in prison with five years of supervised probation for her involvement in a $1 million Nigerian cheque scam. She had an accomplice in Lagos, Nigeria, who shipped her up to $1.1 million worth of counterfeit cheques and money orders with instructions on where to ship them.

== In popular culture ==
Research suggests that some Nigerian hip-hop musicians have strong connections with some Yahoo Boys (cybercriminals). Due to the increased use of the 419 scams on the Internet, it has been used as a plot device in many films, television shows and books. A song, "I Go Chop Your Dollar", performed by Nkem Owoh, also became internationally known as an anthem for 419 scammers using the phrases "419 is just a game, I am the winner, you are the loser". Other appearances in popular media include:

- The 2018 film Nigerian Prince follows a Nigerian-American teenager sent to Nigeria by his mother, where he connects with his cousin Pius, who runs 419 scams for a living.
- The 2016 short story The Nigerian Prince – When The Scammer Becomes The Scammed by L. Toshua Parker follows the true story of a U.S. college student and hacker in 2000 who targeted Nigerian 419 scammers and stole millions back from them.
- In "A Thief in Ni-Moya", a 1981 novella from Robert Silverberg's Majipoor series, a young woman is swindled out of her savings under the pretense of fees required to inherit a large estate.
- The novel I Do Not Come To You By Chance by Nigerian author Adaobi Tricia Nwaubani explores the phenomenon.
- The 2006 direct-to-DVD film EZ Money features an instance of this scam as its central premise.
- In the 2007 Futurama straight-to-DVD film Bender's Big Score, Professor Farnsworth falls for a lottery scam, giving away his personal details on the Internet after believing he has won the Spanish national lottery. Later, Nixon's Head falls for a "sweepstakes" letter by the same scammers, while Zoidberg is taken by an advance-fee fraud, thinking he is next of kin to a Nigerian Prince.
- In series 6, episode 3 of the BBC television series The Real Hustle, the hustlers demonstrated the 419 scam to the hidden cameras in the "High Stakes" episodes of the show.
- In the HBO comedy series Flight of the Conchords episode "The New Cup", the band's manager, Murray, uses the band's emergency funds for what appears to be a 419 scam—an investment offer made by a Mr. Nigel Soladu, who had e-mailed him from Nigeria. However, it turns out that Nigel Soladu is a real Nigerian businessman and the investment offer is legitimate, although Murray notes that, despite Mr. Soladu having e-mailed many people for an investment, only he had taken him up on it. The band receives a 1000% profit, which they use to get bailed out of jail.
- The Residents included a song called "My Nigerian Friend" in their 2008 multimedia production The Bunny Boy.
- In the pilot episode, "The Nigerian Job", of Leverage, the group uses the reputation of the Nigerian scam to con a deceitful businessman.
- The 2012 novel 419 by Will Ferguson is the story of a daughter looking for the persons she believes responsible for her father's death due to suicide following a 419 scam. A follow-up to earlier novels about con men and frauds (Generica and Spanish Fly), 419 won the 2012 Giller Prize, Canada's most distinguished literary award.
- In the video game Warframe, Nef Anyo ran an advance-fee fraud during Operation False Profit, where players attempted to reverse the scam and steal credits from him in order to bankrupt him and prevent his creation of a robotic army.
- MC Frontalot's song "Message No. 419" is about a 419 scam.
- In the Vampire: The Eternal Struggle card game the Osebo clan has a card to perform a 419 Operation.
- A 2016 episode of Family Guy titled "Scammed Yankees" sees Peter Griffin and his father-in-law Carter fall victim to a 419 scam and travel to Africa to get the money back.
- Chris Okagbue, a Nigerian actor and member of the Onitsha royal family, starred in a 2026 Vaseline commercial that analogizes the Nigerian prince scam to counterfeit Vaseline products.

== See also ==
- Sakawa, fraud in Ghana with African traditional rituals
- Nigerian organized crime
- Pigeon drop
