= List of collaborative software =

This list is divided into proprietary or free software, and open source software, with several comparison tables of different product and vendor characteristics. It also includes a section of project collaboration software, which is a standard feature in collaboration platforms.

== General ==
Systems listed on a light purple background are no longer in active development.

=== General Information ===
Name	Creator	Latest stable release	Stable release date	First public release date	Database backend	License	Software product available	SaaS available
Adobe LiveCycle	Adobe	9	2010		Filesystem	Proprietary	Yes	No
Alfresco	Alfresco Software	26.2	2026-07-30[±]	2005	MariaDB, MySQL, Oracle, PostgreSQL, SQL Server	LGPL	Yes	Yes
Altova MetaTeam	Altova GmbH	2013	2012	2010	Cloud	Proprietary	No	Yes
Assembla	Assembla	Continuous Delivery	2013	2006		Proprietary	Yes	Yes
Collaborate	HighQ	4.4	2018	2001		Proprietary	No	Yes
Collabora Online	Collabora	26.04.4.3	2026-10-09	2016	n/a as integrates with storage providers	MPLv2	Yes	Yes
ConceptDraw Office	CS Odessa	4.4	2018-04-17	2008		Proprietary	Yes	Yes
Confluence	Atlassian	10.2.18	8 September 2026; 60 days ago[±]	2004		Proprietary	Yes	Yes
Drupal	Drupal	11.4.1	3 July 2026; 4 months ago	2001	MariaDB, Microsoft SQL Server, MySQL, Percona Server, PostgreSQL, SQLite	GPL 2, 3	Yes	Yes
EGroupware	EGroupware	16.1	2021	2003	MariaDB, MySql, PostgreSQL	GPLv2	Yes	Yes
Easy Redmine	Easy Software	13.3.0	October 2023	2007	MySQL database (Percona)	Proprietary Software based on Redmine	Yes	Yes
Elium	Elium	4	2024	2009		Proprietary	Yes	Yes
EMC Documentum eRoom	EMC	7.4.4	2012	2003	Filesystem	Proprietary	Yes	No
Google Drive	Google				Cloud	Proprietary	No	Yes
GoTo Connect	GoTo	4.15.0	2025-05-22	March 2019	Cloud	Proprietary	Yes	Yes
Grasshopper	GoTo	v6.2.2	2025-06-16	2003	Cloud	Proprietary	Yes	Yes
HumHub	HumHub GmbH & Co. KG	1.19.3	2026-10-27; 11 days ago	2014	MariaDB, MySQL	AGPL	Yes	Yes
IBM Connections Suite	IBM	6 CR5	2019-05-30[±]	June 27, 2007	IBM Db2	Proprietary	Yes	Yes
IBM Domino	IBM	8.5.2	2010-08-24	December 1996		Proprietary	Yes	Yes
IBM Notes	IBM					Proprietary	Yes	Yes
IBM Sametime	IBM					Proprietary	Yes	Yes
ICEFLO	Agenor Technology	v 3.15.0		2009	IBM SoftLayer	Proprietary	Yes	Yes
IceWarp Mail Server	IceWarp	14.3.0.4	2026-19-05	1998		Proprietary	Yes	Yes
Jive	Jive Software	9.0.7.1	2019-03-20[±]	2006	Oracle, MS SQL, Db2, mySQL, Postgres	Proprietary		
Kolab	The Kolab-Project and Kolab Systems AG	3.3	2014-08-20	July 17, 2003	IMAP(File/mail)-based	various Free Software licenses	Yes	Yes
Kune	Comunes Collective	1.0.0	2015-03-18	July 17, 2003		AGPL	Yes	Yes
LibreOffice Online	The Document Foundation	6.13	2018	2017		MPL 2.0	Yes	No
LogicalDOC	Logical Objects	Community Edition 8.7.3	2022-02-08	2006		LGPL	Yes	Yes
Microsoft Exchange Server	Microsoft	2016	2011-08-04	2007	Exchange DB	Proprietary	Yes	Yes
Microsoft Live Meeting	Microsoft	2007	2007	1997		Proprietary	Yes	Yes
Microsoft Lync Server	Microsoft	2010	2010	November 2000	SQL Server or SQL EE	Proprietary	Yes	Yes
Microsoft Office	Microsoft	2016	2016	1990		Proprietary	Yes	Yes
Microsoft Project Server	Microsoft	2010	2010-06-15	2000		Proprietary	Yes	Yes
Microsoft SharePoint Foundation	Microsoft	2013 SP1	2014-04-17	2001	SQL Server or SQL EE	Proprietary	Yes	No
Microsoft SharePoint Server	Microsoft	16.0.19725.20280	2026-5-12	2001	SQL Server or SQL EE	Proprietary	Yes	Yes
Microsoft SharePoint Workspace	Microsoft	16.0.19725.20280	2026-5-12	2007		Proprietary	Yes	No
Microsoft Team Foundation Server	Microsoft	2015	2015	1994	SQL Server or SQL EE	Proprietary	Yes	No
Microsoft Windows Live	Microsoft	2011	2010-09	November 1, 2005	Cloud	Proprietary	No	Yes
Nefsis	Nefsis	3.72	2011-01-07	1998	Cloud	Proprietary	Yes	Yes
Nextcloud	Nextcloud	35.0.2	2026-10-15; 23 days ago	2016	MariaDB, MySQL, Oracle, PostgreSQL, SQLite	AGPLv3+	Yes	Yes
Notion	Notion Labs Inc.			2016		Proprietary	Yes	Yes
Oracle WebCenter	Oracle	11g	2009-07			Proprietary		
Redmine				2006	Multpiple	GPLv2	Yes	Yes
SAP NetWeaver Portal	SAP			2004		Proprietary		
Tiki Wiki CMS Groupware	Tiki Software Community Association	27.1	2024-11-23; 23 months ago	October 2002	MariaDB, MySQL	LGPL	Yes	No
TrackerSuite.Net	Automation Centre	3.6	2010-11	2006	SQL Server	Proprietary	Yes	Yes
Traction TeamPage	Traction Software	7.0 (23)	2025-11-30[±]	December 1, 1999	NoSQL Journal, MySQL	Proprietary	Yes	Yes
Wrike	Wrike	2013	2007	2006	PostgreSQL	Proprietary	No	Yes
WPS Office	Kingsoft	2019	2019-05-06	1988	SQL Server or SQL EE	Proprietary	Yes	Yes
XWiki	XWiki	18.9.0	2026-10-26[±]	May 22, 2007	HSQLDB, MariaDB, MySQL, PostgreSQL, Oracle	LGPL	Yes	Yes
Zoho Projects	Zoho	5.0	2015-01-20	August 26, 2006	MySQL	Proprietary	No	Yes
Name	Creator	Latest stable release	Stable release date	First public release date	Database backend	License	Software product available	SaaS available

=== Comparison of unified communications features ===
Name	E-mail server	Faxing	Instant messaging	Telephony	Videoconferencing	Web conferencing	Data conferencing	Application sharing	Electronic meeting system	Synchronous conferencing
GoTo Connect	No	Yes, virtual fax to email	Yes	Yes	Yes	Yes	Yes	Yes	Yes	Yes
IBM Sametime	No, integrated with Lotus Domino	No	Yes	Yes	Yes	Yes	Yes	Yes	Yes	Yes
IBM Lotus Domino	Yes	Yes	Yes with integrated Sametime	Yes with integrated Sametime	Yes with integrated Sametime	Yes with integrated Sametime	No	Yes with integrated Sametime	Yes with integrated Sametime	No
IceWarp Mail Server	Yes	No	Yes	Yes	Yes	Yes	No	No	No	Yes
Microsoft Exchange Server	Yes	Yes	No	No	No	No	No	No	Yes	No
Microsoft Lync Server	No, integrated with Exchange Server	No	Yes	Yes	Yes	Yes	Yes	Yes	Yes	Yes
Microsoft SharePoint	No, integrated with Exchange Server	No	No	No	No	No	No	No	Yes	No
Nextcloud	Yes	Yes, email to VOIP	Yes	Yes	Yes	Yes	Yes collaborative editing with integrated video conferencing	Yes	Yes	Yes
Name	E-mail server	Faxing	Instant messaging	Telephony	Videoconferencing	Web conferencing	Data conferencing	Application sharing	Electronic meeting system	Synchronous conferencing

=== Comparison of collaborative software features ===
Name	Wikis	Web publishing	Calendaring software	Project management	Workflow system	Document management	List management	XML Forms management and workflow	Discussion	Blogs	Surveys	Time tracking	Business intelligence	Charting	Bookmarking, Tagging, Rating and Comments	Social software	Enterprise search	Office suite
ClickUp	Yes	Yes	Yes	Yes	Yes	Yes	Yes	No	Yes	Yes	Yes	Yes	Yes	Yes	Yes	Yes	Yes	Yes
Easy Redmine	Yes	Yes	Yes	Yes	Yes	Yes	No	No	Yes	No	No	Yes	No	Yes	Yes	Yes	Yes	No
EGroupware	Yes	Yes	Yes	Yes	Yes	Yes	Yes	Yes	No	No	No	Yes	Yes	Yes	Yes	No	Yes	Yes, web, webdav
Google Workspace	Yes, Sites	Yes, Sites	Yes	No	No	Yes, simple	No	Yes, simple	Yes	Yes	Yes	No	No	Yes	Yes	Yes	Yes	Yes
IBM Connections	Yes	Yes	Yes	Yes, simple	Yes	Yes, simple	No	No	Yes	Yes	No	No	No	No	Yes	Yes	No	No
IBM Lotus Domino	No	No	Yes	Yes, simple	Yes	No	No	No	No	No	No	No	No	No	No	No	No	No
IceWarp Mail Server	No	No	Yes	Yes, simple	Yes	Yes	No	No	Yes	No	No	No	No	No	Yes	Yes	No	Yes
Jive Software	Yes	Yes	Yes	Yes, simple	No	Yes	No	No	Yes	Yes	Yes	No	No	Yes	Yes	Yes	Yes	Yes, MS Office Interface
Kune	Yes	In development	Yes	Yes, simple	No	Yes	yes, wave-based	No	Yes	Yes	yes (gadget)	No	No	No	In development	Yes	No	Real-time collaborative documents
Microsoft Exchange Server	No	No	Yes	Yes, simple	Yes	No	No	No	No	No	No	No	No	No	No	No	No	No
Microsoft Office	No	No	No	No	No	Yes, simple	No	Yes	No	No	No	No	No	Yes	No	No	No	Yes, desktop
Microsoft Project Server	No	No	Yes	Yes	No	No	No	No	No	No	No	Yes	No	No	No	No	No	No
Microsoft SharePoint	Yes	Yes	Yes	Yes, simple	Yes	Yes	Yes	Yes	Yes	Yes	Yes	Yes	Yes	Yes	Yes	Yes	Yes	Yes, web
Microsoft Team Foundation Server	No	No	Yes	Yes	Yes	Yes	No	No	Yes	No	No	Yes	No	Yes	Yes	No	Yes	No
Nextcloud	No	Yes	Yes	Yes	Yes, limited	No	No	No	Yes	No	Yes	Yes	Yes, limited	Yes	Yes, limited	Yes	Yes, limited	Yes
Smartsheet	No	Yes	Yes	Yes	Yes	Yes	Yes	No	Yes	No	Yes	Yes	No	Yes	No	No	Yes	Yes, MS Office Interface
Traction TeamPage	Yes	Yes	Yes	Yes	Yes, simple	Yes	Yes	No	Yes	Yes	Yes, plug-in	Yes, basic	No	Yes, usage charts, API	Yes	Yes, plug-in	Yes	Yes, web, webdav
Tiki Wiki CMS Groupware	Yes	Yes	Yes	Yes, simple	Yes	Yes	Yes (newsletter)	Yes	Yes	Yes	Yes	Yes	No	Yes (basic)	Yes	Yes	Yes	Yes, web
Wrike	No	No	Yes	Yes	Yes	Yes	No	No	Yes	No	No	Yes	No	Yes	Yes	Yes	No	Yes, web
Trello	No	No	Yes, limited	Yes	Yes	No	No	No	Yes	No	Yes	Yes	No	No	Yes	Yes	No	No
XWiki Enterprise	Yes	Yes	Yes, extension	Yes, extension	Yes, extension	Yes, extension	Yes, extension	Yes, extension	Yes, extension	Yes	Yes, extension	No	No	Yes, extension	Yes, and extension for rating	Yes	Yes, (Lucene/SolR)	Yes, web
Zoho Projects	Yes	No	Yes	Yes	Yes, limited	Yes	No	No	Yes	No	No	Yes	No	Yes	Yes, limited	Yes	No	Yes, web
Name	Wikis	Web publishing	Calendaring software	Project management	Workflow system	Document management	List management	XML Forms management and workflow	Discussion	Blogs	Surveys	Time tracking	Business intelligence	Charting	Bookmarking, Tagging, Rating and Comments	Social software	Enterprise search	Office suite

=== Comparison of targets ===
Name	Public	Intranet	Extranet	Personal Sites	Team Sites	Developer
IBM Connections	Yes	Yes	Yes	Yes	Yes	Yes
IBM Lotus Domino	Yes	Yes	Yes	Yes	Yes	Yes
IBM Lotus QuickPlace	Yes	Yes	Yes	Yes	Yes	Yes
Microsoft Exchange Server	Yes	Yes	Yes	No	No	No
Microsoft Office Live Communications Server	No	Yes	Yes	Yes	Yes	No
Microsoft SharePoint	Yes	Yes	Yes	Yes	Yes	Yes
Microsoft Team Foundation Server	No	Yes	Yes	Yes	Yes	Yes
Nextcloud	Yes	Yes	Yes	Yes	Yes	Yes
Name	Public	Intranet	Extranet	Personal Sites	Team Sites	Developer

== Open source software ==
The following are open source applications for collaboration:

=== Standard client–server software ===
- Access Grid, for audio and video-based collaboration
- Axigen
- Citadel/UX, with support for native groupware clients (Kontact, Novell Evolution, Microsoft Outlook) and web interface
- Cyn.in
- EGroupware, with support for native groupware clients (Kontact, Novell Evolution, Microsoft Outlook) and web interface
- GroupOffice groupware and CRM
- Kolab, various native PIM clients
- Kopano
- OpenGroupware.org
- phpGroupWare
- Scalix
- SOGo, integrated email, calendaring with Apple iCal, Mozilla Thunderbird and native Outlook compatibility
- Zarafa
- Zentyal, with support for native groupware clients (Kontact, Novell Evolution) natively for Microsoft Outlook and web interface
- Zimbra
- Zulip

=== Groupware: Web-based software ===
- Axigen
- Bricolage, content management system
- BigBlueButton, Web meetings
- Collabora Online, Enterprise-ready edition of LibreOffice enabling real-time collaborative editing of documents, spreadsheets, presentations and graphics
- DotNetNuke, also called DNN: module-based, evolved from ASP 1.0 demo applications
- EGroupware, a free open source groupware software intended for businesses from small to enterprises
- EtherPad, collaborative drafting with chat
- Feng Office Community Edition
- FusionForge, has wiki, forums, mailing lists, FTP, SSH, subdomains, hosting, email alias, backups, CVS/SVN, task management
- Group-Office, Web-based groupware for sharing calendars, files, e-mail, CRM, Projects, Mobile Synchronization and much more.
- Horde
- HumHub a free and open-source enterprise social network solution
- IceWarp Server
- Jumper 2.0, collaborative search engine and knowledge management platform
- Kolab Groupware, integrated Roundcube web frontend
- Kune, collaborative federated social network, based on Apache Wave
- Loomio, for making decisions together (AGPL).
- MediaWiki, which provides core content management and integrates with many other tools via extensions
- Nextcloud, file hosting service, functionally similar to Dropbox, Office 365 or Google Drive when used with its integrated office suite solutions Collabora Online or OnlyOffice
- OnlyOffice Community Server, available for Microsoft and Linux
- OpenBroadcaster LPFM IPTV broadcast automation tools
- Overleaf for creating LaTeX documents
- phpGroupWare
- Simple Groupware
- SOGo, integrated email, calendaring with Apple iCal, Mozilla Thunderbird and native Outlook compatibility
- Tiki Wiki CMS Groupware, has wiki, forums, calendar, ticket system, workflow engine
- Tine 2.0
- Tonido, free collaborative software with workspace synchronizing, Web access from personal desktop; cross-platform
- Zarafa, full MAPI MS Exchange replacement for Linux, GPL+proprietary
- Kopano, full MAPI MS Exchange replacement for Linux, GPL+proprietary
- Zentyal
- Zimbra

=== Other ===
- Alfresco, enterprise content management system: document management, workflow, and portal
- Drupal Framework, open source content management framework: document management, web pages, attachments, forums, photos, social profiles, collaboration tools
- Elium, enterprise knowledge management system: lifecycle management, AI, collaboration, wiki and portal
- Liferay Enterprise Portal, open source enterprise portal: document management, wiki, social tools, workflow
- LogicalDOC, document management system: document management, workflow
- Mayan EDMS, description: document management system with optical character recognition, metadata, tagging, automatic indexes and workflows
- Nuxeo EP, enterprise content management system: document management, workflow
- OpenKM, open source document management system: document management

== Project collaboration software ==
=== Web-based software ===
- Ceiton, workflow-based project management with Gantt chart, scheduling calendar and time-tracking
- Central Desktop, has project management, wiki, file upload, review and approve, calendar, document management
- Clarizen, online on-demand, collaborative project execution software
- dotProject
- Easy Redmine, open-source project management software
- Easy Projects
- EGroupware, is free open source groupware software intended for businesses from small to enterprises
- Feng Office Community Edition
- Fle3
- Gitea
- GitLab
- Group-Office, Web-based groupware for sharing calendars, files, e-mail, CRM, Projects, Mobile Synchronization and much more.
- Horde
- LiquidPlanner, web-based project management and collaboration software
- Mindquarry, has document synchronizing, wiki, task management
- PBworks is a commercial real-time collaborative editing (RTCE) system
- phpGroupWare, has a project collaboration module
- Plone, content management
- project.net
- Projectplace, full suite of collaborative project tools
- Redmine, for software projects includes issue tracking, wiki, basic file and document management with hooks to major version control systems: SVN, Git, etc.
- Simple Groupware
- TeamLab, has forums, blogs, bookmarks, wiki, task management, instant messaging, mobile version, CRM, online document editors
- Trac, has wiki, document management, ticket system and version control system
- Traction TeamPage integrated action tracking, wiki, live status, notification, and streams organized by person, task, project, and shared permissioned space.
- web2project, a dotproject fork with active current development and some innovations: subprojects, etc.
- WiserEarth, social network and database that include an open-source Groupware (closed)
- Wrike, interactive web-based project management software and tools for remote collaboration
- Zoho Projects, a web-based project management software with collaboration features such as Interactive Feeds, Chat, Calendar, Forum, Wiki Pages and shared Document management

=== Other ===
- Croquet project, collaborative virtual environment
- Open Wonderland, open source Java toolkit to make collaborative 3D virtual worlds
- Wiki engines: see List of wiki software
- Realtime editors: see Collaborative real-time editor
- Version control for software engineering projects: see Comparison of version-control software
- Collaborative development environment
- Tools for collaborative writing such as O'Reilly Media's wiki-like git-managed authoring platform Atlas

=== Comparison ===
Name	Mail transfer agent	Mail storage type	IMAP server	IMAP shared	Calendar format	Calendar shared	IM server	WebDAV	Web UI	Contacts shared	Files shared	Web admin UI	Antivirus	Spam filter	Notes
Axigen	SMTP proprietary RFC compliant	proprietary indexed storage	proprietary RFC compliant	Yes	iCal	available from Microsoft Outlook & Webmail	No	No	Yes	Yes	No	Yes	ClamAV	SpamAssassin, Sieve, others	Mobile synchronizing using full compliant ActiveSync, Ajax GUI, multiplatform, Microsoft Outlook connector with online/offline modes
Bynari	SMTP Postfix	IMAP	Cyrus IMAP	Yes	iCal	iCal	Jabber	Yes	Yes	Yes	Yes	Yes	ClamAV	SpamAssassin and Sieve	Mobile synchronizing using full compliant ActiveSync, Ajax webapp, Microsoft Outlook connector
Citadel/UX	Custom	Berkeley DB	Custom	Yes	iCal	Yes	Yes	GroupDAV and WebCal support	Yes	Yes	various methods	Yes	ClamAV on SpamAssassin	SpamAssassin, or pre-processed with Postfix or qpsmtpd	Hot backups need retained recent database logs
EGroupware	SMTP	IMAP server dependent	Cyrus or any IMAP server	Yes	iCal	Yes	No	Yes	Yes	Yes	Yes	Yes	Yes on Linux- any external	Sieve filters	Ajax GUI, Mobile responsive template, integrates with: mobile devices (Z-Push), any IMAP client
Feng Office Community Edition	Sendmail, SMTP	Database or File system	Any IMAP server	No	SQL, iCal	iCal	No	No	Yes	Yes	Yes	Yes	Any external (e.g., ClamAV)	Mail server dependent (e.g., SpamAssassin)	Ajax GUI; runs on any operating system with Apache, PHP and MySQL, e.g., Windows, Linux, macOS); commercial support via Feng Office
Group-Office	Custom Postfix	IMAP server dependent	Custom	Yes	iCal	Web interface	No	Yes	Yes	Yes	Yes	Yes	ClamAV	SpamAssassin, DSPAM	Synchronizes with: Microsoft Outlook, iPhone, Android, Symbian, Palm OS, Pocket PC, other SyncML or ActiveSync clients
Horde	Sendmail, SMTP	No	Cyrus, others	No	No	DB, ICAL export	No	Yes	Yes	Yes	Yes	Yes	No	rule-based filtering	integrates into Kolab, has SyncML-interface
Jumper 2.0	No	No	Custom	No	SQL, iCal	iCal	No	Yes	Yes	Yes	Shares any content, media, or data	Yes	No	No	Enterprise bookmarking engine, uses peer and social networking principles to tag and link distributed data resources for universal search regardless of vendor, format, or location
Kolab	Postfix	IMAP (Kolab-XML format) and LDAP	Cyrus and (experimental) Dovecot	Yes	iCal and Kolab-XML format	IMAP, iCal- and HTML-Export	No	Yes	Roundcube	IMAP and LDAP	Yes	Yes	ClamAV, others	SpamAssassin, others	Runs on almost all Unix/Linux; integrated Roundcube webfrontend, and ActiveSync (via Syncroton), and serves most common PIM-clients such as Kontact, Microsoft Outlook (with connector plug-in) and others.
OpenGroupware.org	Postfix	Mail Dir	Cyrus	No	No	Export to iCal	XMPP, if purchased	No	No	No	No	If purchased			
Open-Xchange	Postfix	IMAP server dependent	Cyrus, Courier, Dovecot	Yes	iCal	LDAP, CalDAV, Google, Export to iCal	No	Yes	Yes	Yes	Yes	If purchased	ClamAV, others	SpamAssassin, others	Ajax GUI, Microsoft Outlook integration, tasks module
PhpGroupWare	No	No	No	Unknown	Unknown	ICAL	Yes	Unknown	Yes	Unknown	Yes	Yes			Quite similar to eGroupWare
Simple Groupware	SMTP	IMAP server dependent, Database	Cyrus, Courier IMAP, UW IMAP, others	Yes	SQL, iCal and XML format	Database, ICAL import/export	Built-in chat module	Planned for 0.3	Yes	Yes	Yes	Yes	ClamAV, others	Mail server dependent	Synchronizes with: Outlook, Symbian, Pocket PC, mail notifications, document preview
Tine 2.0	Postfix or any other SMTP Server	SQL	DBMail or other IMAP-server	if IMAP server support	SQL	not yet CalDAV or iCal	No	No	Yes	Yes	No	Yes	No	No	Uses external IMAP server; synchronizes with: Symbian, Palm OS, Pocket PC, other ActiveSync clients
Tonido Workspace	No	No	No	No	Synchronizing, Web-based access	Built-in chat module	Yes	Yes	Yes	Yes	Yes	Yes	No	No	Free, for Windows, Mac OS X, Linux; built-in web server allows P2P synchronizing similar to Microsoft Groove and usual guest workspace access via Ajax-based WebUI
Twproject	relies on existing SMTP	synchronizes with clients	No	Yes	iCal	iCal	No	No	Yes	Yes	Yes	Yes	No	No	Synchronizes with: Outlook, Google calendars, mail; full project management module
Wrike	No	No	No	No	iCal	Yes	No	Yes	Yes	Yes	Yes	Yes	No	No	Mobile synchronizing using full compliant Dropbox & Google docs, rich Ajax web access, Microsoft Outlook & iMail connector
Zarafa	Postfix, Exim, Qmail, Sendmail, others	MySQL, optional attachments on filesystem	Yes	Public Folder available	Outlook, WebApp, Webaccess, iCal, Z-Merge	Outlook, WebApp, Webaccess, Z-Merge	Yes	Yes	Yes	Yes	Yes	Yes	ClamAV, others	SpamAssassin, others	HTML5 WebApp (with Videoconferencing functionality and (large) file sharing), Ajax WebAccess, online and offline Outlook compatibility, fully ActiveSync compatible using Z-Push (Symbian, Pocket PC, iPhone (firmware 2.X), Nokia (mail4Exchange)), integrates with AD and LDAP, own serverside integration framework Z-Merge
Kopano	Postfix, Exim, Qmail, Sendmail, others	MySQL, optional attachments on filesystem	Yes	Public Folder available	Outlook, WebApp, iCal, Z-Merge	Outlook, WebApp, Z-Merge	Yes	Yes	Yes	Yes	Yes	Yes	ClamAV, others	SpamAssassin, others	HTML5 WebApp (with Videoconferencing functionality and (large) file sharing), Ajax WebAccess, online and offline Outlook compatibility, fully ActiveSync compatible using Z-Push (Symbian, Pocket PC, iPhone (firmware 2.X), Nokia (mail4Exchange)), integrates with AD and LDAP, own serverside integration framework Z-Merge
Zentyal	Postfix	IMAP server dependent	Dovecot	No	Outlook, Webaccess, iCal	Outlook, Webaccess	Unknown	Unknown	Yes	Yes	Unknown	Yes	ClamAV	SpamAssassin	Ajax Web UI, online and offline Outlook native compatibility, fully ActiveSync compatible using SOGo integrates with Samba AD server
Zimbra	Custom Postfix	Mail Dir w/ index db	Custom	No	iCal	ICAL	(Removed in v8)	Yes	Yes	Yes	Yes	Yes	ClamAV	SpamAssassin, DSPAM	
Name	Mail transfer agent	Mail storage type	IMAP server	IMAP shared	Calendar format	Calendar shared	IM server	WebDAV	Web UI	Contacts shared	Files shared	Web admin UI	Antivirus	Spam filter	Notes

== See also ==
- Cloud collaboration
- Collaborative workflow
- Collaborative editor
- Comparison of project management software
- Comparison of wiki software
- Document collaboration
- Document-centric collaboration
- List of wiki farms
- List of wiki software
