= Kanban board =

Display of work at stages in a process

A kanban board

A kanban board is a visual management tool to represent and track work as it progresses through stages of a process. It is commonly used to implement kanban work management practices at a personal, team, or organizational level.

Kanban boards visually depict work at various stages of a process using cards to represent work items and columns to represent each stage of the process. Cards are moved from left to right to show progress and to help coordinate teams performing the work. A kanban board may be divided into horizontal "swimlanes" representing different kinds of work or different teams performing the work.

Kanban boards can be used for knowledge work or manufacturing processes.

Simple boards have columns for "waiting", "in progress", and "completed" or "to-do", "doing", and "done". Complex kanban boards can be created that subdivide "in progress" work into multiple columns to visualise the flow of work across a whole value stream map.

According to the Project Management Institute, a kanban board is a "visualization tool that shows work in progress to help identify bottlenecks and overcommitments, thereby allowing the team to optimize the workflow."

== Applications ==
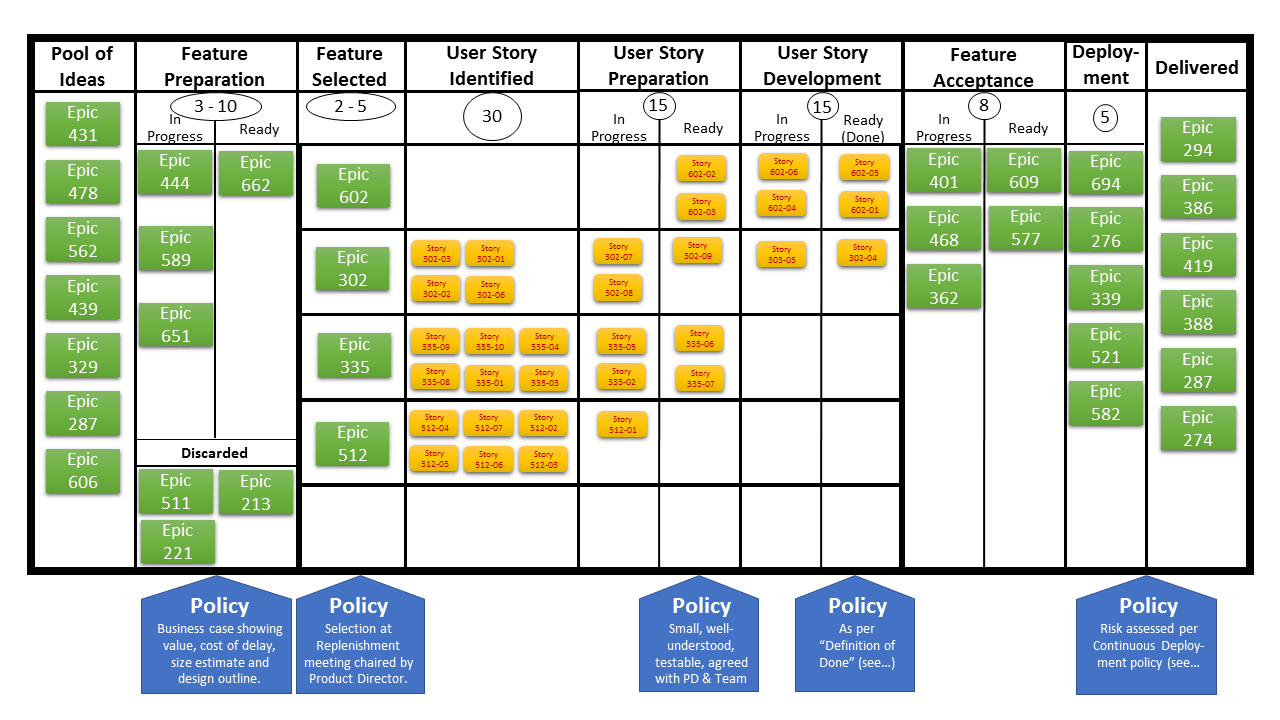
A kanban board in software development

Kanban can be used to organize many areas of an organization and can be designed accordingly. The simplest kanban board consists of three columns: "to-do", "doing" and "done", though some additional detail such as WiP limits is needed to fully support the Kanban Method. Business functions that use kanban boards include:

- Kanban board for the software development team. A popular example of a kanban board for agile or lean software development consists of: Backlog, Ready, Coding, Testing, Approval and Done columns. It is also a common practice to name columns in a different way, for example: Next, In Development, Done, Customer Acceptance, Live.
- Kanban for marketing teams
- Kanban for HR teams
- Personal task management or "personal kanban"
- Kanban for accounting teams. Usually consists of columns: new items, ready for distribution, in progress, and completed.

== Notable tools ==
A growing number of personal and project management applications incorporate kanban boards into their software, including:

- Airtable, enables users to store, organize, collaborate on, and automate structured data.
- Asana, with boards.
- Azure DevOps Server, an integrated ALM-platform for managing work in and across multiple teams.
- CA Technologies Rally, provides teams with the option of managing pull-based, lean software development projects.
- ClickUp, a cloud-based personal and project management application.
- Evernote.
- Github Projects
- Jira, provides kanban boards.
- Kanboard, open source kanban-based project management software.
- Microsoft Planner, a planning application available on the Microsoft Office 365 platform.
- Monday.com, a cloud-based platform that allows users to create their own applications and work management software.
- Notion, a project management and database application includes kanban board views.
- Odoo, an open-source ERP and CRM, provides kanban boards for most apps.
- OpenProject, a web-based open source project management system with the ability to create action boards to implement Kanban boards.
- Pivotal Tracker provides kanban boards.
- ServiceNow platform, offers kanban style visual task boards.
- Trello, cards-based project management.
- Tuleap, agile open source tool for development teams: customize board columns, set WIP (Work In Progress), connect the board with Issue Trackers, Git, Documents.
- Twproject (formerly Teamwork), project and groupware management tool.
- Unicom Focal Point, a portfolio management and product management tool.
- Wrike, An agile collaborative work management.
- Workflowy, A web-based outliner.
- Redmine (with plugins) and its spinoff projects Easy Redmine and OpenProject

== See also ==
- Kanban (development)
- Scrum
- Continuous-flow manufacturing
- Getting Things Done
- Project management
- Task management
- Visual control
