= HighQ =

British-Canadian software company

HighQ Solutions
- Company type: Private
- Industry: Collaboration platform
- Founded: 2001
- Headquarters: Toronto, Canada
- Key people: Co-founder and CEO: Ajay Patel; CFO: Amit Patel; CSO: Stuart Barr; CTO: Saviz Izadpanah
- Products: HighQ Collaborate; HighQ Publisher; HighQ Dataroom
- Parent: Thomson Reuters
- Website: highq.com

HighQ Solutions Ltd. is a privately owned software as a service (SaaS) company providing cloud-based secure file sharing, team collaboration and social networking software. HighQ was founded in London in 2001 by university friends Ajay Patel and Veenay Shah. The company has offices in the UK (London), Australia (Sydney), the Netherlands (Amsterdam), Germany (Frankfurt), USA (New York) and an R&D operation in India (Ahmedabad). It has customers in the legal, banking and corporate sectors as well as government and life sciences.

In January 2016, HighQ raised its first investment round of $50M from Morgan Stanley, Goldman Sachs and One Peak Partners, to expand into the US market.

Thomson Reuters acquired HighQ in 2019.

== Industry recognition ==
HighQ was awarded the "Legal Technology Company of the Year" award at the FT Intelligent Business Awards, 2019.

HighQ was awarded the "Supplier of the Year" award at The British Legal Technology Awards, 2019.

HighQ was included as "One to Watch" in the 2013 Sunday Times Tech Track 100 league table and was ranked 74th in the 2014 Tech Track 100 league table and ranked 32nd among UK's top 100 SMEs in the Sunday Times Heathrow SME Export Track 100 2016.

HighQ was ranked in the Deloitte Technology Fast 500 EMEA 2011 and 2013 and ranked in the Deloitte Technology Fast 50 UK 2013.

== Clients ==
HighQ's major clients include Barclays, Linklaters, Lex Mundi, Clifford Chance, Osborne Clarke, Clyde & Co and Allen & Overy. HighQ's clients include 21 of the top 25 UK law firms, including all of the UK Magic Circle law firms, and 80% of the top 100 UK law firms.

== Products ==
HighQ offers file sharing, extranet, collaboration, project management, virtual data room, enterprise social networking, knowledge sharing and publishing solutions. It has three products which each cover different aspects of these use cases: HighQ Collaborate, HighQ Publisher and HighQ Dataroom.

The primary product, HighQ Collaborate, provides secure document exchange, enterprise social collaboration, client extranets and knowledge portals for organizations. In summer 2013, HighQ released a new mobile version of Collaborate which saw a redesign of its existing modules and added features including a responsive design, microblogging, private messaging, centralized notifications and enhanced people profiles.

HighQ Publisher is a digital marketing and publishing platform that supports various publishing formats and channels including publications, videos, events, micro-sites and email campaigns.

HighQ Dataroom is a virtual data room product aimed primarily at law firms, banks and corporations to help users exchange transactional information with clients and partners outside of their company.

== See also ==
- Collaboration platform
- Collaboration software
- List of collaborative software
- Cloud collaboration
- Document collaboration
