= Zoetrope All-Story Workshop =

Collaborative tool for filmmakers and writers

The Zoetrope Virtual Studio is a submission destination and collaboration tool for filmmakers and writers founded by Francis Ford Coppola. It is a community where writers and artists in different disciplines and genres can submit and workshop original work. It is also a resource for information about the Coppola family and American Zoetrope.

== History ==
In March 1998, Francis Ford Coppola launched a website where writers could submit their short stories to his magazine, Zoetrope: All-Story, and also for evaluation and feedback from the other writer-members. A community of writers quickly formed around the website. It became so popular that a few months later Coppola launched sites for novellas and screenplays.

The Virtual Studio, which launched in June 2000, brings together the original sites as departments, plus includes new departments for other creative endeavors. Members can workshop a wide range of film arts including music, graphics, design, and film and video.

One of the most prominent writers to emerge from the workshop is Chimamanda Ngozi Adichie,whose Orange Prize winning novel Half of a Yellow Sun (2006) began as a short story that was workshopped on the site.
