= Kolab =

Open source groupware suite

Kolab Groupware-Server
- Developers: The Kolab-Project and Kolab Systems, also via Kolab Now
- Release: July 17, 2003; 23 years ago
- Stable release: 16.1 / December 15, 2016; 9 years ago
- Written in: C++, PHP, Python etc.
- Operating system: Unix-like
- Available in: English, German and many others (multilingual)
- Type: Groupware, Collaborative software
- License: Various Free Software / Open Source Software Licenses
- Website: kolab.org
- Repository: git.kolab.org/source/kolab/

Kolab is a free and open source groupware suite. It consists of the Kolab server and a wide variety of Kolab clients, including KDE PIM-Suite Kontact, Roundcube web frontend, Mozilla Thunderbird and Mozilla Lightning with SyncKolab extension and Microsoft Outlook with proprietary Kolab-Connector PlugIns.

== Basic Concepts ==
Kolab uses IMAP as an underlying protocol for email, contact, and calendar entries. These entries are saved in IMAP folders in Kolab XML format, and the IMAP server controls storage and access rights. Configuration and maintenance of Kolab is done by LDAP.

Kolab Clients and the Kolab server use well established protocols and formats for their work (i.e. IMAP as mentioned above, vCard, iCal, XML and LDAP). This allows the Kolab Format specification framework, or even portions of it, to be utilized as an open set of specifications for groupware clients and servers to communicate with each other. Third party implementations began almost immediately; for example, the Citadel groupware server began supporting version 1 of the Kolab Format specification in March 2004.

The concepts on which Kolab relies are laid out in the Kolab Format Specification and Architecture Paper for Kolab 2, and for Kolab 1 in the Kroupware Contract, Architecture Paper and Technical Description.

== Main features ==
- Full seamless support of mixed clients environments (Outlook, KDE, Web etc.)
- Full server side support for ActiveSync and CalDAV, CardDAV and WebDAV
- Support for Email, Calendar, Address Books, Tasks and File-Cloud
- Support for KDE with Kontact
- Support for Microsoft Outlook with proprietary connector PlugIns
- A web administration interface
- Configuration data is kept in a LDAP directory
- A global LDAP addressbook for contacts
- IMAP4rev1 as well as POP3 access to mail
- Full support for client-side PGP and S/MIME email encryption (officially Sphinx-interoperable)
- Full support for shared calendars with IMAP ACLs
- Full support for shared contacts with IMAP ACLs
- Fully offline capable using KDE Kontact or Microsoft Outlook
- Support for server side resource management (e.g. rooms, cars)
- Full support for freebusy handling

== Kolab 3.x clients ==
- Roundcube is the default web client delivered with Kolab 3.0;
- KDE Kontact, starting with version 4.10, and Kontact-Touch (K Desktop Environment, Free Software);
- SyncKolab, starting with version 3.0.0, is a Mozilla Thunderbird/SeaMonkey and Lightning extension (Free Software);
- Kolab Desktop Client is a stabilized and professionally supported version of KDE Kontact.

== Kolab 2.x clients ==
- KDE Kontact and Kontact-Touch (K Desktop Environment, Free Software)
- Horde (integrated in Kolab since v2.2.1), a web-frontend for utilising web-browsers as Kolab-clients (Free Software)
- SyncKolab, a Mozilla Thunderbird / SeaMonkey and Lightning extension (Free Software)
- evolution-kolab (integrated in GNOME / Evolution since v3.4, see,) extends GNOME's Evolution and EDS (Evolution-Data-Server) to be a full-featured Kolab-client (Free Software)
- Kolab's integrated Horde also provides a SyncML interface, over which SyncML-capable mobile phones can synchronise PIM-data on a Kolab-server (Free Software)
- Z-Push (integrated in Kolab since v2.3.0) enables ActiveSync-capable clients to access their server mailboxes and to use Kolab-provided PIM-functionality (Free Software)
- Kolab-WS extends Kolab to provide Kolab-functionality as a web-service; Kolab-WS was originally part of Syncphony, which utilises Kolab-WS since their split (Free Software)
- Syncphony (initially "kolab-sync") connects Kolab-WS with a Funambol sync-server, thus enabling devices supported by Funambol to synchronise their PIM-Data with a Kolab server (Free Software)
- kolab-android synchronises Android's addressbook and calendar to IMAP-folders in the Kolab2 format (Free Software)
- Toltec Connector (Microsoft Outlook Connector, Proprietary Software)
- KONSEC Konnektor (Microsoft Outlook MAPI Storage Provider, Proprietary Software)
- Bynari Outlook Connector (Microsoft Outlook MAPI Provider, Proprietary Software)
- Aethera, a client solely for the Kolab 1 format, available for Windows, Linux and Mac OS X (Free Software)
- Roundcube is the default Webclient in the Kolab 2.4 release

== History ==
2013:

- Kolab 3.0 was released, featuring the improved Kolab 3 format based on xCard and xCal, the Roundcube web-client, a new ActiveSync component called Syncroton and other new properties.
- Kolab Now hosted solution was launched. It lets customers create individual accounts or managed domain accounts, with the possibility to move data to a self-hosted Kolab 3 installation any time. The service is operated by Kolab Systems in Switzerland.

2012:

- evolution-kolab had its first release as part of the GNOME initiative in Evolution 3.4.
- SyncKolab was massively overhauled and released as version 2.0 for Thunderbird / SeaMonkey (optionally with Lightning for calendaring and tasks).
- evolution-kolab was vastly enhanced and had its second release as part of the GNOME initiative in Evolution 3.6.
- SyncKolab 3.0 was largely rewritten, yielding speed and feature improvements, and now supports the Kolab 3 format.

2011:

- Kolab 2.3.0 was released, containing many updated core components and other improvements, the new Z-push synchronization for clients using ActiveSync (in addition to the already existing SyncML support) and an overhauled web-based administration front-end.
- Kolab 2.3.1 was released shortly thereafter, as a bugfix release.
- Kolab 2.3.2 was released as a regular maintenance release of the Kolab 2.3 branch, with updated Postfix and Z-push components.
- Kontact 2 was released next to KDE SC 4.6.4, with many improvements related to Kolab.
- evolution-kolab was released, which extends GNOME's Evolution and EDS (Evolution Data Server) to become a full-featured Kolab client.
- Kolab 2.3.3 was released, providing a lot of bugfixes for the Horde components and many updated base components (Apache, Cyrus IMAP, OpenLDAP, OpenSSL and PHP).
- Kolab 2.3.4 was released as a bugfix release.
- Kolab-WS was split out of Syncphony as a standalone web service, providing Kolab functionality. Hence Syncphony solely becomes a Funambol connector.

2010:

- KolabiPhone, a Kolab sync connector for the iPhone, had its first pre-alpha release.
- Two new Free Software Kolab sync connectors for Android and Outlook were announced and their first alpha releases published.
- Syncphony was released, which extends Kolab with a Funambol connector and offers Kolab functionality as a web service.
- SyncKolab 1.5 for Thunderbird 3 / SeaMonkey 2 (optionally with Lightning 1.0 beta for calendaring and tasks) was released.
- Kolab 2.2.4 was released as a maintenance release of the Kolab 2.2 branch.
- Kontact Touch was released, offering full Kolab functionality on mobile devices, such as smartphones and tablets.

2009:

- Kolab 2.2.1 was released, as an enhancement and maintenance release, integrating an updated web client (Horde) and preliminary SyncML support.
- Kolab 2.2.2 was released, as a maintenance release of the Kolab 2.2 branch.
- Kolab 2.2.3 was released, further enhancing functionality, stability and scalability of the Kolab 2.2 branch.

2008:

- SyncKolab 1.0 for Thunderbird 1.5 and 2.0 as well as SeaMonkey 1.0 and 1.1 (optionally with Lightning 0.9 for calendaring and tasks) was released.
- Kolab 2.2 was released, with full support of multiple mail domains, integrated Horde web front-end, updated base packages (OpenPKG, OpenLDAP, Cyrus IMAP, Postfix, Perl, Apache, PHP, etc.), easier integration in operating system distributions, and many other new features.

2007:

- Kolab 2.1 was released.
- A third Outlook connector was released.

2006:

- Kolab 2.1 was designed with many significant enhancements over 2.0.

2005:

- KolabSyncML ("Sync4j Kolab Connector / SyncSource"), a Kolab Java interface and Funambol connector, had its first alpha release.
- Kolab 2.0 was released.
- A second Outlook connector appeared on the market.
- The SyncKolab project started developing a Mozilla Thunderbird / SeaMonkey and Lightning connector.

2004:

- Aethera became a Kolab 1 groupware client.
- Citadel/UX learned how to mimic a Kolab 1 groupware server.
- Kolab 2 was designed as a general overhaul and implemented utilizing the versatile and extensible Kolab Open Format to store groupware data.
- The Kroupware Client matured to KDE Kontact.

2003:

- KMail and the KDE PIM software were enhanced, creating the Kroupware Client.
- Kolab 1.0 was released.
- The first Outlook connector was developed.

2002:

- Kolab 1 / Kroupware was designed utilizing iCal and vCard formats to store calendar entries, contacts, notes, tasks etc. in Kolab's IMAP directories.
