= Conferencing =

Conferencing may refer to:

- Web conferencing, a service that allows conferencing events to be shared with remote locations
- Videoconferencing, the conduct of a videoconference by a set of telecommunication technologies
- Teleconference, held by one or more computers
- Synchronous conferencing, the technologies informally known as online chat
- Data conferencing, a communication session among two or more participants sharing computer data in real time
- Conference call, a type of telephone call

== See also ==
- Conference
