= Computer conferencing =

Computer conferencing may refer to:

- Teleconference supported by one or more computers
- Web conferencing
- Data conferencing
- Distributed computer applications:
  - Instant messaging
  - Online chat
