= Collaboration tool =

Tool that helps people to collaborate

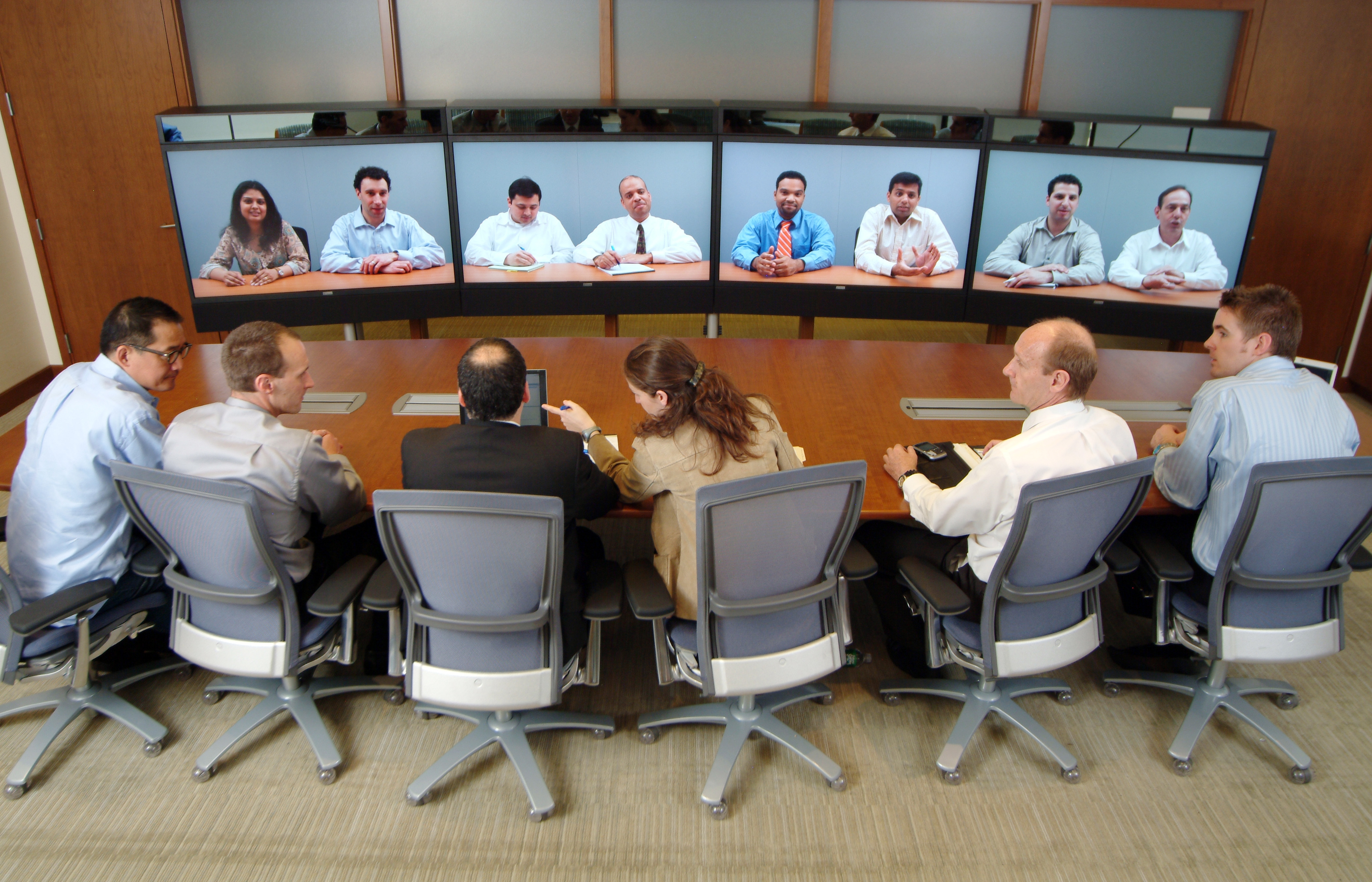
A high resolution telepresence system in use

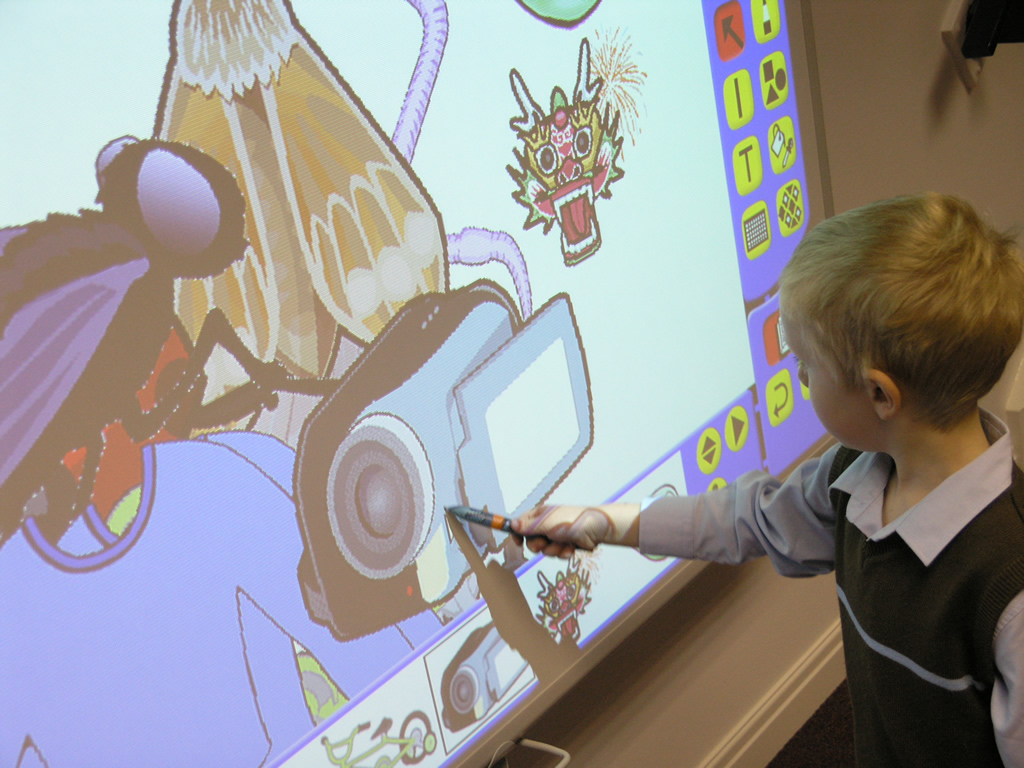
A student using an interactive whiteboard

A collaboration tool helps people to collaborate. The purpose of a collaboration tool is to support a group of two or more individuals to accomplish a common goal or objective. Collaboration tools can be either of a non-technological nature such as paper, flipcharts, post-it notes or whiteboards. They can also include software tools and applications such as collaborative software.

== Early computer-based collaboration tools ==
The first idea to use computers in order to work with each other was formed in 1945 when Vannevar Bush shared his thoughts on a system he named "memex" in his article "As We May Think". A system that stores books, records and communications of an individual and makes them available at any time. At this stage he called it "an enlarged supplement to his memory".

=== Computerized office automation ===
In 1968 computer systems were brought in connection with communication and the potential way of working together when not at the same place by Dr. J. C. R. Licklider, head of the U.S. Defense Advanced Research Projects Agency (DARPA). In his article "The Computer as a Communication Device", he envisioned the idea that there should be a way of "facilitating communication among people without bringing them together in one place", which eventually led to ARPANET, commercial time-sharing systems and finally the Internet.

When the microcomputer was invented in 1970, everyone learned about office automation, which led to the first collaborative software called Electronic Information Exchange System (EIES) that allowed to do surveys, threaded replies and group-structured approaches. In 1991 educator C. A. Ellis came up with the definition of the term "groupware" as "computer-based systems that support groups of people engaged in a common task (or goal) and that provide an interface to a shared environment". Paul Wilson then shaped the term "computer-supported cooperative work" (CSCW). He described it as "a generic term which combines the understanding of the way people work in groups with the enabling technologies of computer networking, and associated hardware, software, services, and techniques".

This laid the foundation to develop further on the ideas of groupware and in the 1990s Lotus Notes, Microsoft Exchange Server and Outlook were invented. In 2002 at the Social Software Summit Clay Shirky introduced the phrase “social software” as a "software that supports group interaction".

== Main types ==
Three aspects of collaboration: communication, coordination and cooperation can be used to categorize collaboration tools.

=== Communication ===
Communication tools provide exchange of information between individuals:

==== E-Mail ====
The adoption of email as a collaboration tool changed communication in the workplace. It is a well-established method of communication within an organization. One of its specialties is managing daily correspondence, since an email can reach multiple people simultaneously.

==== Voicemail ====
Voicemail as a collaboration tool is more and more integrated in services such as Google Voice. As pointed out in an IBM future scenario the role of voicemail could be that of what email is for us today.

==== Instant messaging (IM) ====
Instant messaging functions as a means of communicating within an organisation in real-time.

==== VoIP (voice over IP) / video call ====
Voice over IP as a collaboration tool has gained popularity among companies as part of their communication portfolio. A report from Eclipse Telecom points out, the VoIP is moving towards the state to replace our telephones in our offices and also integrate in existing collaboration service environments.

=== Coordination ===
Coordination is defined as "the deliberate and orderly alignment or adjustment of partners’ actions to achieve jointly determined goals". Collaboration tools supporting this are the ones who allow a person to set up group activities, schedules and deliverables.

==== Online calendars ====
Online calendars are part of professional behaviour at work and fully integrated in other systems. As a research paper from University of Bath explains, online calendars could in the future be much closely linked to other data such as social media and have even a larger effect.

==== Time-tracking software ====
Time trackers are especially used to measure the performance of employees. Its effect on productivity is discussed as being controversial.

==== Spreadsheets ====
Spreadsheets are like emails very popular within the corporate environment and as a collaboration tool essential for financial analysis or modelling. Although very popular, several studies found out that many spreadsheets contain inaccurate data and are therefore inefficient.

=== Cooperation ===
Cooperation tools allow groups to have real-time discussions and to shape an idea or thought together. Trends in terms of collaboration target on helping to maintain the "main idea" within big organizations and make connections visible. Also the idea of bringing people who are not working in a company on a regular basis into the organization and make use of their knowledge.

==== Video conferencing ====
In most cases video conferencing is part of the overall communication and collaboration strategy of organisations. Especially now when all services are cloud-based and therefore implementation costs became more affordable. The longterm vision for video conferencing lies in the correct usage of computer processing power, data storage or mobile bandwidth speeds to further decrease the obstacles of collaboration.

==== IM teleconferencing ====
Bringing teams, meetings or events as close as possible is what teleconferencing solutions want to do. Apart from business environments Teleconferencing is currently used in a variety of fields, such as telemedicine, where they contribute enormously to the efficiency and productivity as distance and time are limited factors.

== Classification based on dimensions ==
=== Asynchronous collaboration tools ===
A collaboration tool is asynchronous when its users are collaborating at a different time:

==== E-Mail, mailinglists and newsgroups ====
E-Mail is the best known asynchronous collaboration tool and the most common used - it offers intuitive features for forwarding messages, creating mailing groups and attaching documents. Furthermore, information can be automatically chronologically sorted and assigned to tasks or calendar events.

==== Group calendar ====
Through group calendars meetings can be scheduled, projects managed and people coordinated. It is designed to help a person overlook their deliverables and deadlines. A group calendar includes functions such as the detection of conflicting schedules with other people in a team or organization or coordination of meeting times that suit everybody in a team. Besides the positive effects of group calendar there is also controversy about privacy and control that might influence a person's productivity.

==== Workflow systems ====
With workflow systems files or documents can be communicated to the organization by following a strict and organised process. They provide services for routing, development of forms and support for roles. As current workflow systems are controlled from one point, individuals within an organization normally do not have the permission to manage their own processes so far - this should be changed by implementing collaborative planning tools to current workflow systems.

=== Synchronous collaboration tools ===
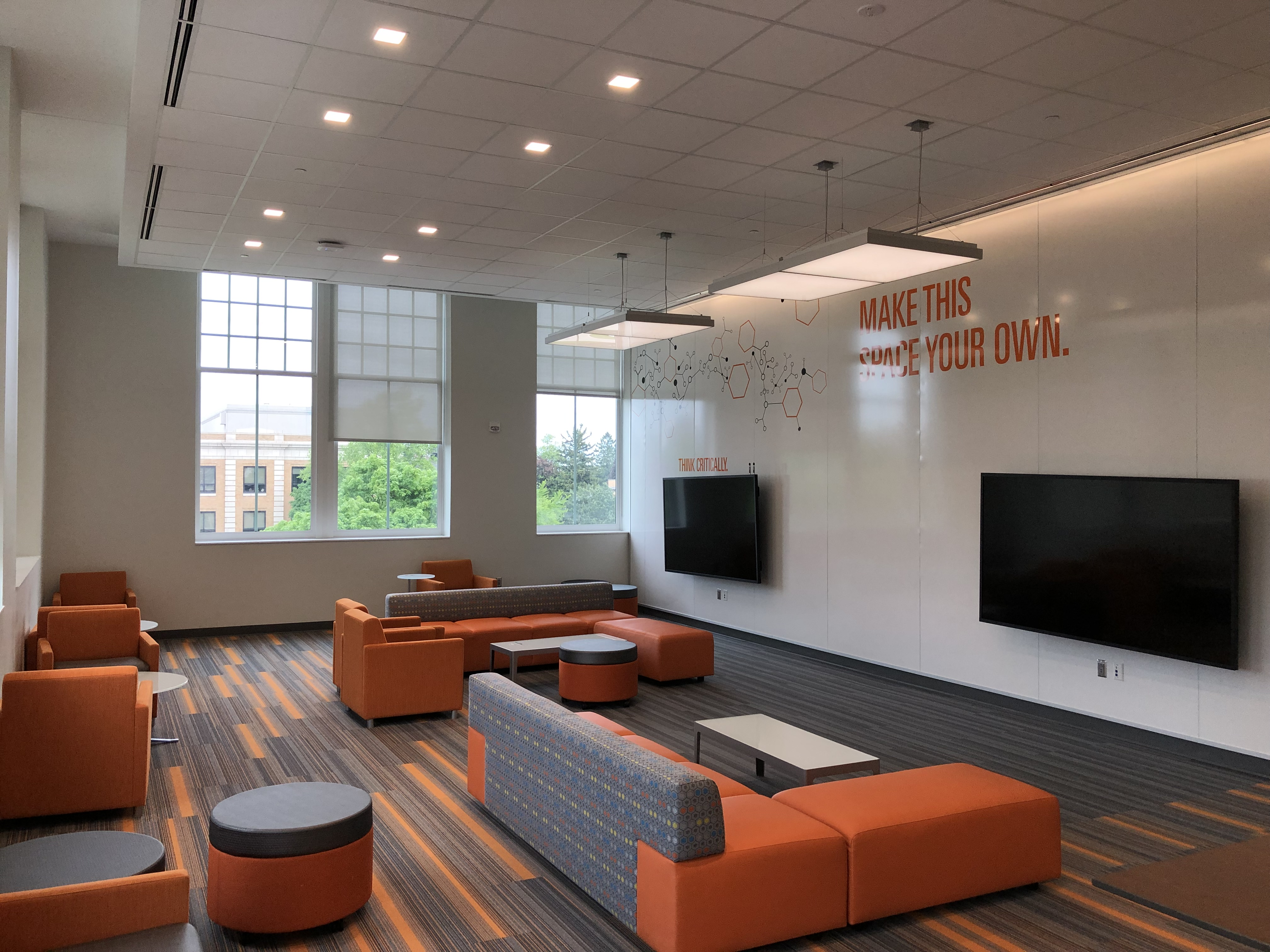
A room designed to encourage collaboration.

A collaboration tool is synchronous, when its users are collaborating at the same time:

==== Shared whiteboards ====
Shared whiteboards give its users the capability to work on a task through a web-based platform. They can be used for informal discussions and also for communications that need structure, involve drawing or are in general more sophisticated. This might also be very useful in to realise virtual classrooms.

==== Video communication systems ====
Video communication systems offer two-way or multi-way calling with a live videostream. It can be best compared to a telephone system with an additional visual element.

==== Chat systems ====
Chat systems allow people to write and send messages in real-time. They are usually structured in chat rooms which show usernames, number of people, location, discussion topic and more.

==== Decision support systems ====
Decision support systems support groups to manage the decision making process. They give people the ability to exchange their brainstorming, analyzing their ideas and even are used for voting. Decision making is becoming more and more a core function of modern work. According to studies 50% of organizational decisions fail.

==== Multiplayer video games ====
Computer games are a common example of how a multi-user situation could look like in the future. They are constantly developed and expanded with features such as chat and video systems.

== Online Collaboration Tools ==
Online collaboration tools are web-based applications that offer basic services such as instant messaging for groups, mechanisms for file sharing and collaborative search engines (CSE) to find information distributed within the system of the organization, community or team. Additionally, the functionality is sometimes further expanded by providing for example integrated online calendars, shared online-whiteboards to organize tasks and ideas or internet teleconferencing integrations. The focus of online collaboration tools ranges from simple to complex, inexpensive to expensive, locally installed to remotely hosted and from commercial to open source.

=== Background ===
New gadgets and devices are invented every day with the goal in mind to make our daily work easier. Online collaboration tools currently try to tackle problems like these:

- '38% of employee time is lost duplicating work and 58% of people waste an hour a day looking for information'.
- '28 hours a week is spent on writing e-mails, searching for information and collaborating internally'.
- '59% of managers miss vital information because they cannot find it or never see it'.
- 'Six weeks per year are wasted by executives searching for lost documents'.

These aspects point out that the problem we are facing is not a technological problem - it is about people and their interactions. Although technology really helps us in this way, the key to solve these problems can be found in the way how we use these tools. Although video conferencing tools such as Skype or FaceTime connect us with everyone, they do not always give us all the contextual information. What we see might not be the reality, as there might be other people in the room that one does not know about while skyping with one's colleagues at work. More connectivity also allows more interruption: A person can work from home but is always interrupted by their neighbours or the lawnmower. This is why the future of collaboration tools looks for models that allow companies to collaborate in a focused and structured manner. One such application is the Finnish company Fingertip Ltd, which enables companies to facilitate collaboration and decision making.

=== Evolvement ===
==== From simple communication solutions to Unified Communications (UC) ====
The way we communicate with each other is constantly changing and disrupts our workplace environment. In 1971 programmer Ray Tomlinson sent the first message between two computers. Eight years later Usenet, a multi-network online forum, changed the way how we exchange information. With IRC in 1986, instant-messaging and group chatting became accessible for non-technical users for the first time and after the launch of AOL/AIM in 1992 we already faced the first global community. The invention of Wikipedia in 2001 and various social networks (MySpace, Linkedin and Facebook) forms a community that is connected to the digital world, globally oriented and willing to use collaboration tools not only for social interaction, but to enhance the efficiency at the workplace.

==== From local to global - the needs of a global workforce ====
Online Collabarative Tools facilitate global operations and flexible working arrangements in modern organizations. These collaborative digital environments support corporate globalization by fostering innovation and enabling cross-border knowledge management. Both small and medium-sized enterprises (SMEs) and large corporations utilize these platforms to conduct international business. Since the mid-20th century, the expansion of digital communication has accelerated information flows and altered the workforce skills required for collaborative tasks. Consequently, these tools serve as a core infrastructure for firms operating within globally integrated industries.

IBM conducted a study with CIO’s of organizations to find out which trends will most affect business in 2010, coming up with six main points:

1. The participatory internet
2. Changing workforce demographics
3. The rise of software as a service
4. The virtualization of data and devices
5. Increasing of simplicity of technology’s design and use

All of these points are stressing the importance of collaboration and define certain requirements for the future of online collaboration tools in order to consistently enable a wide business collaboration. Online collaboration tools such as social networking websites and web conferencing are demonstrating how fast the environment is changing – “by 2010, the average salaried worker will actively participate in at least five different ad hoc teams simultaneously”.

When asking participants of “The New Global Study”, a report done by the European Commission in 2009, about the benefits of online collaboration, the following three points were mentioned most:

1. Supports coordination within a team (73% of respondents)
2. Supports knowledge and learning (69%)
3. Allows dispersed team-members to be a better part within the team

== See also ==
- List of collaborative software
- Collaborative software
- Cloud collaboration
- Document collaboration
- Mass collaboration
- Virtual collaboration
