= Cyn (disambiguation) =

Cyn may refer to:

- Cynthia Nabozny, a singer and songwriter who goes by "Cyn"
- Cynthia Payne, an English brothel keeper known as Madam Cyn
- Cyn Santana, a Love & Hip Hop: New York cast member
- Cyn, a character from the animated YouTube web series Murder Drones
- Cyclic neutropenia, a hematologic disorder abbreviated as CyN
- Cylindrospermopsin, a cyanotoxin abbreviated as CYN
- cyn-, a taxonomic affix meaning dog
- Cyn.in, an enterprise collaborative software
- Christian Youth for the Nation, the youth ministry of Jesus Is Lord Church Worldwide
- Cynwyd Line, abbreviated as CYN, a SEPTA Regional Rail line in Philadelphia and Bala Cynwyd
- Cary station (North Carolina), abbreviated as CYN, an Amtrak station in Cary, North Carolina
- Zhongyuan Airlines, a former Chinese airline with ICAO code CYN
