= AT Conference, Inc. =

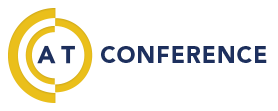
- AT Conference, Inc.
- Formerly: American Teleconnect
- Type: Private
- Industry: Communication Technology
- Founded: 1999
- Founder: David Jannetti
- Headquarters: Southampton, New York, USA
- Key people: David Jannetti, President and CEO
- Products: Audio conferencing, Web conferencing
- Website: atconference.com

AT Conference, Inc. is a global provider of audio conferencing and web conferencing services.

== History ==
American Teleconnect was founded in 1999 by President and CEO, David Jannetti. On May 2, 2006, the company announced that its name had been officially changed to AT Conference.

AT Conference is headquartered in Southampton, New York. The company also has operations in Georgia and Massachusetts.

== Products and services ==
AT Conference provides global reservation-less conference calling, web conferencing, and operator-assisted conferencing. Other services include call recording, transcription service, application and desktop sharing, live polling, and presenter video-casting.

The company uses a cloud-based call management application and a proprietary cloud-based account management tool.

== Acquisitions ==
- October 2007 - California-based Tiger Communications
- January 2008 - Georgia-based A Professional Conference Call
- September 2008 - Wisconsin-based MixMeeting's Conferencing Division
- January 2012 - Alabama-based EnterConference

== Awards and recognition ==
- 2004 - Inc. 500
- 2006 - Ranked 433 in the Deloitte New York Technology Fast 500
  Deloitte Technology Fast 500
- 2008 - Inc. 5000
- 2009 - Ranked 429 in Deloitte Technology Fast 500

Inc. 5000

- 2010 - Deloitte Technology Fast 500

Inc. 5000

- 2011 - Inc. 5000
- 2013 -Inc. 5000 Honor Roll Alumni
