= GroupOffice =

Groupware and CRM application

GroupOffice groupware
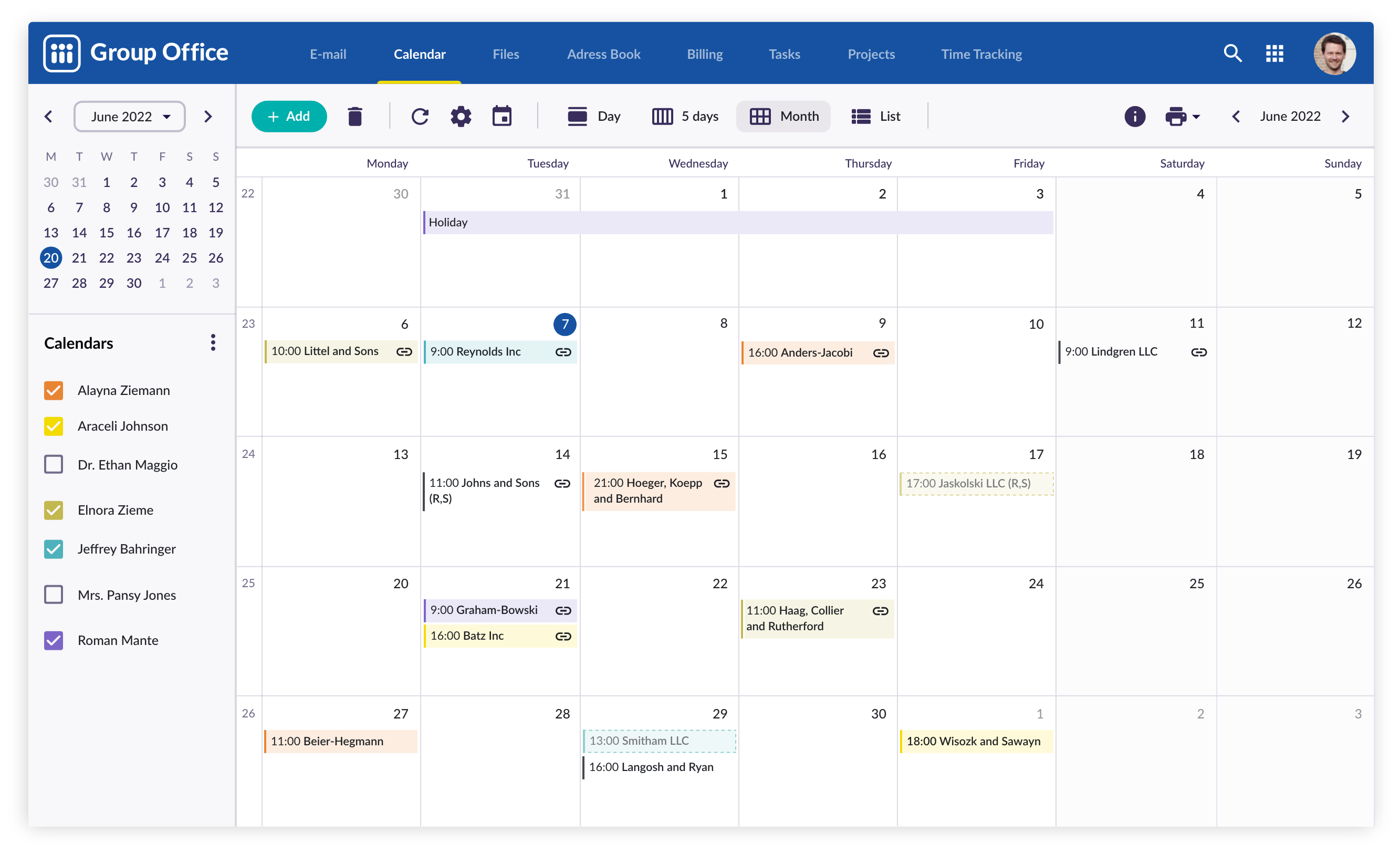
- Calendar view of GroupOffice
- Developer: Intermesh
- Stable release: 26.0.48 / September 21, 2026; 55 days ago
- Operating system: Platform-independent
- Available in: Chinese, Italian, Croatian, Czech, Danish, Dutch, English, French, German, Greek, Japanese, Norwegian, Russian, Spanish
- Type: Groupware, CRM
- License: AGPL/Proprietary
- Website: https://www.group-office.com
- Repository: https://github.com/intermesh/groupoffice/

GroupOffice is an open-source groupware, CRM and DMS platform for enterprises and the public sector. It’s created and maintained by the Dutch company Intermesh. The software can either be self-hosted or run on Intermesh’s cloud infrastructure, where data is kept private.

Major features of the software include integrated file sharing, video conferencing, E-mail, calendar and contact management, project and time tracking, quoting and invoicing, support ticketing, and the Collabora Online office suite.

== History ==
The first release was made via SourceForge in 2003.

In March 2010 GroupOffice was compared to other collaborative software in the German c't magazine. A special version was included for the bundled DVD.

As of November 2012, the project has had over 420,000 downloads from SourceForge since its public appearance in March 2003. SourceForge made a blog post about GroupOffice in 2010. GroupOffice had a stall and presented at Linux Wochen 2005 in Vienna. and OSC2005 in Tokyo. The software has been translated into 27 locale with local communities in Japan and Austria. Version 2.13 of the software was included in the Dutch The Open CD.

In mid-2012, GroupOffice 4.0 was released. The PHP framework was completely rewritten using the Model View Controller design pattern.

In February 2026, GroupOffice 26.0 was released.

== See also ==
- List of collaborative software
- Comparison of time-tracking software
