= Cloud collaboration =

Co-authoring documents via cloud computing

Cloud collaboration is a method of sharing and co-authoring computer files via cloud computing, whereby documents are uploaded to a central "cloud" for storage, where they can then be accessed by other users. Cloud collaboration technologies allow users to upload, comment and collaborate on documents and even amend the document itself, evolving the document. Businesses in the last few years have increasingly been switching to use of cloud collaboration.

== Overview ==
Cloud computing is a marketing term for technologies that provide software, data access, and storage services that do not require end-user knowledge of the physical location and configuration of the system that delivers the services. A parallel to this concept can be drawn with the electricity grid, where end-users consume power without needing to understand the component devices or infrastructure required to utilize the technology.

Collaboration refers to the ability of workers to work together simultaneously on a particular task. Document collaboration can be completed face to face. However, collaboration has become more complex, with the need to work with people all over the world in real time on a variety of different types of documents, using different devices. A 2003 report mapped out five reasons why workers are reluctant to collaborate more. These are:

- People resist sharing their knowledge.
- Safety issues
- Users are most comfortable using e-mail as their primary electronic collaboration tool.
- People do not have incentive to change their behaviour.
- Teams that want to or are selected to use the software do not have strong team leaders who push for more collaboration.
- Senior management is not actively involved in or does not support the team collaboration initiative.

As a result, many providers created cloud collaboration tools. These include the integration of email alerts into collaboration software and the ability to see who is viewing the document at any time. All the tools a team could need are put into one piece of software so workers no longer have to rely on email.

== Origins ==
Before cloud file sharing and collaboration software, most collaboration was limited to more primitive and less effective methods such as email and FTP among others where every change to a file was saved to a local hard drive or local area network, and had to be manually shared with other users. When two or multiple people changed a file simultaneously they could not view each other's additions until saving then sharing the file.

Very early moves into cloud computing were made by Amazon Web Services who, in 2006, began offering IT infrastructure services to businesses in the form of web services. Cloud computing only began to come to prominence in 2007 when Google decided to move parts of its email service to a public cloud. It was not long before IBM and Microsoft followed suit with LotusLive and Business Productivity Online Standard Suite (BPOS) respectively. With an increase in cloud computing services, cloud collaboration was able to evolve. Since 2007, many firms entered the industry offering many features.

Many analysts explain the rise of cloud collaboration by pointing to the increasing use by workers of non-authorised websites and online tools to do their jobs. This includes the use of instant messaging and social networks. In a survey taken in early 2011, 22% of workers admitted to having used one or more of these external non-authorised websites. Cloud collaboration packages provide the ability to collaborate on documents together in real time, making the use of non-authorised instant messaging redundant. IT managers can now properly regulate internet based collaboration with a system tailor-made for the office.

Cloud collaboration is essential for IT departments with increasingly mobile workers and virtual workplaces needing access to data wherever they are, whether through a web browser, or on newer technologies such as smartphones and tablet devices.

The tech industry experienced several large paradigm changes due to collaborative software:

- The mainframe computing era enabled business growth to be untethered from the number of employees manually processing transactions.
- The personal computing era empowered business users to operate based on individual data and applications on their PCs.
- A decade of network computing established an unprecedented level of transparency of information across multiple groups inside a company and an amazing rate of data exchange between enterprises.

Each of these revolutions brought with it new economies of scale. The cost-per-transaction, the cost of automating office and desktop processes, and finally the cost of network bandwidth fell quickly and enabled business users to apply ICT solutions more broadly to create business value. Most analysts (Forrester, Gartner, etc.) believe that cloud computing unleashed the next wave of tech-enabled business innovation.

During the mainframe era, client/server was initially viewed as a "toy" technology, not viable as a mainframe replacement. Yet, over time the client/server technology found its way into the enterprise. Similarly, when virtualization technology was first proposed, application compatibility concerns and potential vendor lock-in were cited as barriers to adoption. Yet underlying economics of 20 to 30 percent savings compelled CIOs to overcome these concerns, and adoption quickly accelerated.

== Recent developments ==
Early cloud collaboration tools were quite basic with limited features. Newer packages are much more document-centric in their approach to collaboration. More sophisticated tools allow users to "tag" specific areas of a document for comments which are delivered real time to those viewing the document. In some cases, the collaboration software can even be integrated into Microsoft Office, or allow users to set up video conferences.

Furthermore, the trend now is for firms to employ a single software tool to solve all their collaboration needs, rather than having to rely on multiple different techniques. Single cloud collaboration providers are now replacing a complicated tangle of instant messengers, email and FTP.

Cloud collaboration today is promoted as a tool for collaboration internally between different departments within a firm, but also externally as a means for sharing documents with end-clients as receiving feedback. This makes cloud computing a very versatile tool for firms with many different applications in a business environment.

The best cloud collaboration tools:

- Use real-time commenting and messaging features to enhance speed of project delivery
- Leverage presence indicators to identify when others are active on documents owned by another person
- Allow users to set permissions and manage other users' activity profiles
- Allow users to set personal activity feeds and email alert profiles to keep abreast of latest activities per file or user
- Allow users to collaborate and share files with users outside the company firewall
- Comply with company security and compliance framework
- Ensure full auditability of files and documents shared within and outside the organization
- Reduce workarounds for sharing and collaboration on large files

A 2011 report by Gartner outlines a five-stage model on the maturity of firms when it comes to the uptake of cloud collaboration tools. A firm in the first stage is said to be "reactive", with only email as a collaboration platform and a culture which resists information sharing. A firm in the fifth stage is called "pervasive", and has universal access to a rich collaboration toolset and a strong collaborative culture. The article argues that most firms are in the second stage, but as cloud collaboration becomes more important, most analysts expect to see the majority of firms moving up in the model.

== See also ==
- Collaborative intelligence
- Document collaboration
- List of collaborative software
- Collaborative real-time editor
