= SOGo =

Open source groupware server

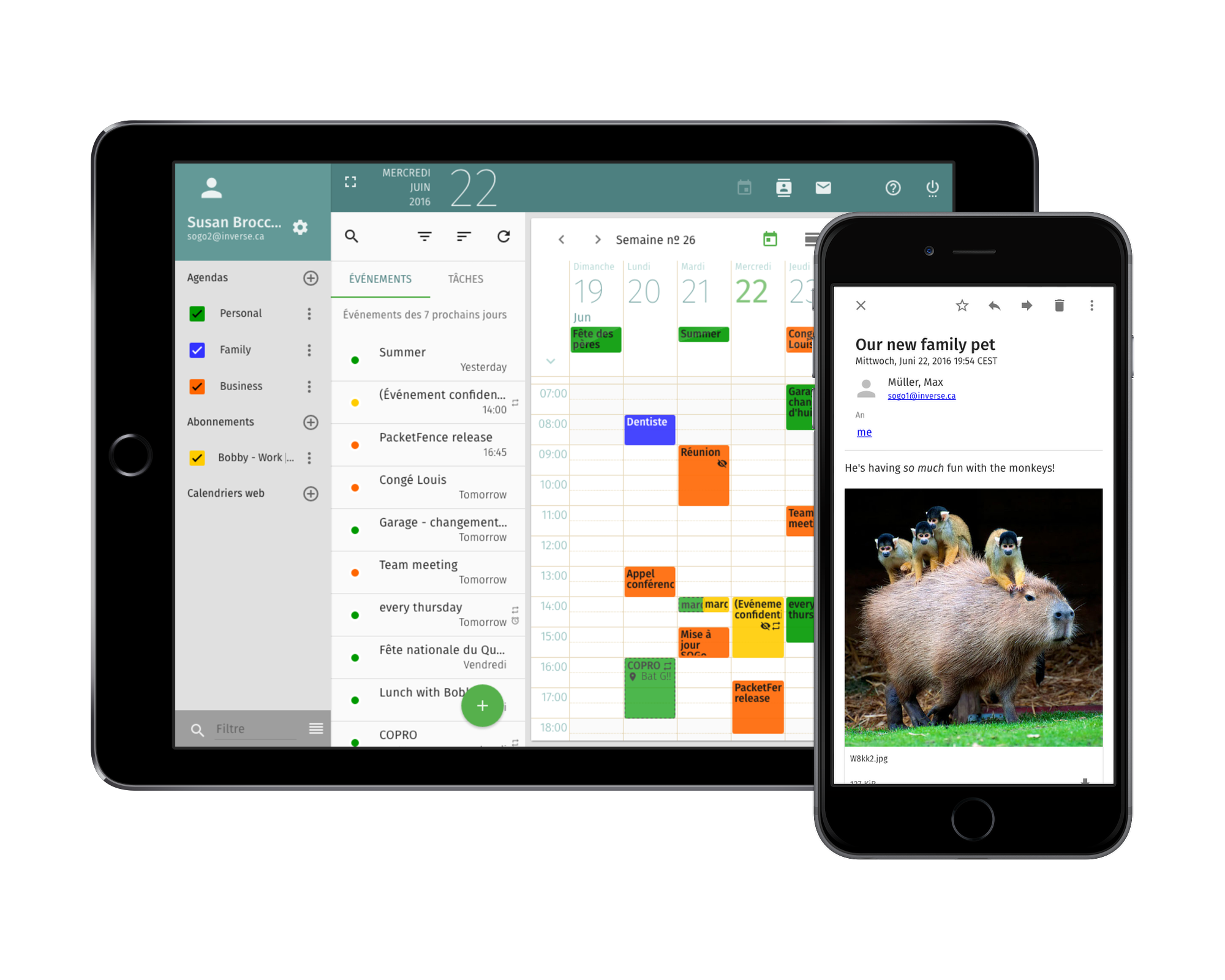
- Developer: Alinto
- Stable release: 5.12.12 / 13 October 2026
- Written in: Objective-C
- Operating system: Unix-like
- Platform: GNUstep, SOPE
- Available in: 44 languages
- Type: Groupware
- License: GPL v2/LGPL v2
- Website: sogo.nu
- Repository: github.com/Alinto/sogo

SOGo, formerly Scalable OpenGroupware.org, is an open source collaborative software (groupware) server with a focus on simplicity and scalability.

SOGo provides collaboration for Mozilla Thunderbird, Microsoft Outlook, Apple Calendar, and BlackBerry client users. Its features include the ability to share calendars, address books, and email using an open source, cross-platform environment. The Funambol middleware and the Funambol SOGo Connector allow SyncML clients to synchronize contacts, events, and tasks.

SOGo supports standard groupware capabilities including CalDAV, CalDAV auto-scheduling, CardDAV, WebDAV Sync, WebDAV ACLs, and iCalendar.

Microsoft Outlook support is provided through an OpenChange storage provider to remove the MAPI dependency for sharing address books, calendars, and emails. Native connectivity to Microsoft Outlook allows SOGo to emulate a Microsoft Exchange server to Outlook clients.

== Features ==
SOGo uses existing services including Microsoft Active Directory, OpenLDAP, SQL, and IMAP. Usage of industry services contributes to scalability. It is accessible through its web interface, desktop clients, or mobile devices.

The web interface uses an AJAX interface and is available in several languages. The look and feel of version 2 mimics Mozilla Thunderbird and provides browser drag and drop capabilities for contacts, events, and mail messages. Single sign-on security capabilities are available by using CAS, WebAuth, or Kerberos. Version 3 is based on AngularJS and Angular Material and provides a fully responsive interface.

Supported desktop clients are Mozilla Thunderbird with the Lightning extension, Apple iCal, and Microsoft Outlook. The SOGo Connector and Integrator extensions for Thunderbird provide improved functionality.

Mobile devices are generally handled through the Microsoft Exchange ActiveSync (EAS) protocol. Devices such Apple's iPhone are handled natively by SOGo as iOS supports CalDAV and CardDAV. Other devices can access the web interface, which is responsive since release 3.0.0.

== History ==
The project's history began in 1996 with LSOffice, an online collaboration platform developed by German Internet service provider MDlink. LSOffice was renamed SKYRiX Groupware Server, and Skyrix Software AG of Magdeburg, Germany, was spun off to take over the product in 2000. It was based upon the SOPE application server, an open source derivative of WebObjects developed by the same company.

Around 2003, much of the SKYRiX Groupware Server source code was released as an open source project called OpenGroupware.org ("OGo"). Though it was intended to complement the OpenOffice.org office productivity suite, the two projects were independent. OpenGroupware.org was functionally rich but offered limited scalability. It was primarily designed for workgroups or small organizations, not large enterprise deployments.

In early 2004, a large client contracted with Skyrix Software to deploy OpenGroupware.org to 60,000 users. The result of this project was Scalable OpenGroupware.org ("SOGo"), a fork of OpenGroupware.org focused on scalability. Though lacking much of the functionality of OpenGroupware.org, it retains the key email, calendaring, and address book features and conforms to open standards like CalDAV and CardDAV.

Development of OpenGroupware.org began to stall around 2006, and the project was largely dormant by 2009.

SOGo remains actively maintained. Open source consulting company Inverse of Montreal, Canada, took over development of the project around 2006. In May 2022, email services provider Alinto of Lyon, France, became the new commercial steward of the project.
