= Kanboard =

Project management open source software application

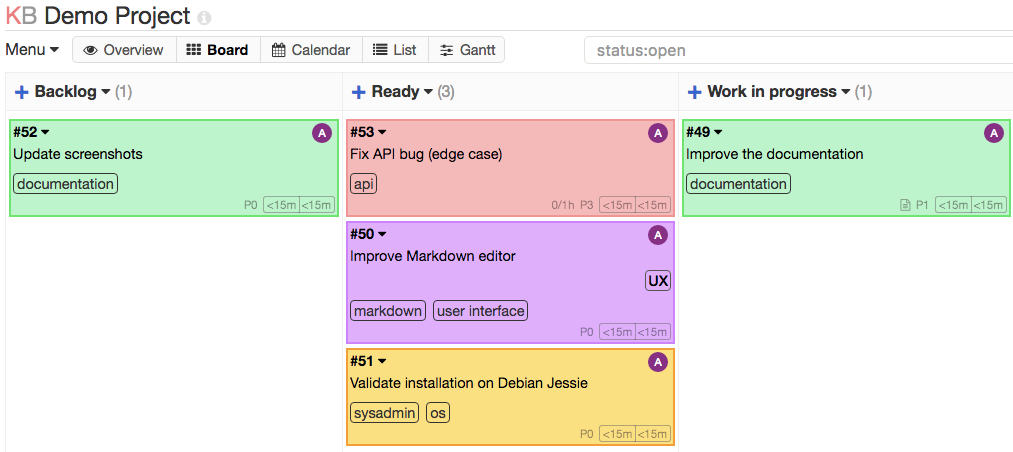
- Kanboard
- Developer(s): Frédéric Guillot
- Initial release: July 2014; 11 years ago
- Stable release: 1.2.42 / 10 November 2024; 8 months ago
- Repository: github.com/kanboard/kanboard
- Written in: PHP
- Operating system: Unix-like, Windows
- Type: Project management
- License: MIT License
- Website: kanboard.org

Kanboard is a project management open source software application that uses a Kanban board to implement the Kanban process management system. Features include a minimal drag-and-drop web user interface, a command line interface and ability to automate repetitive tasks. Kanboard uses SQLite by default and can use other SQL databases. Various plugins by external authors provide additional customisation and expansion capabilities, e.g. custom CSS themes to change the default appearance.
