= LogicalDOC =

Document management system

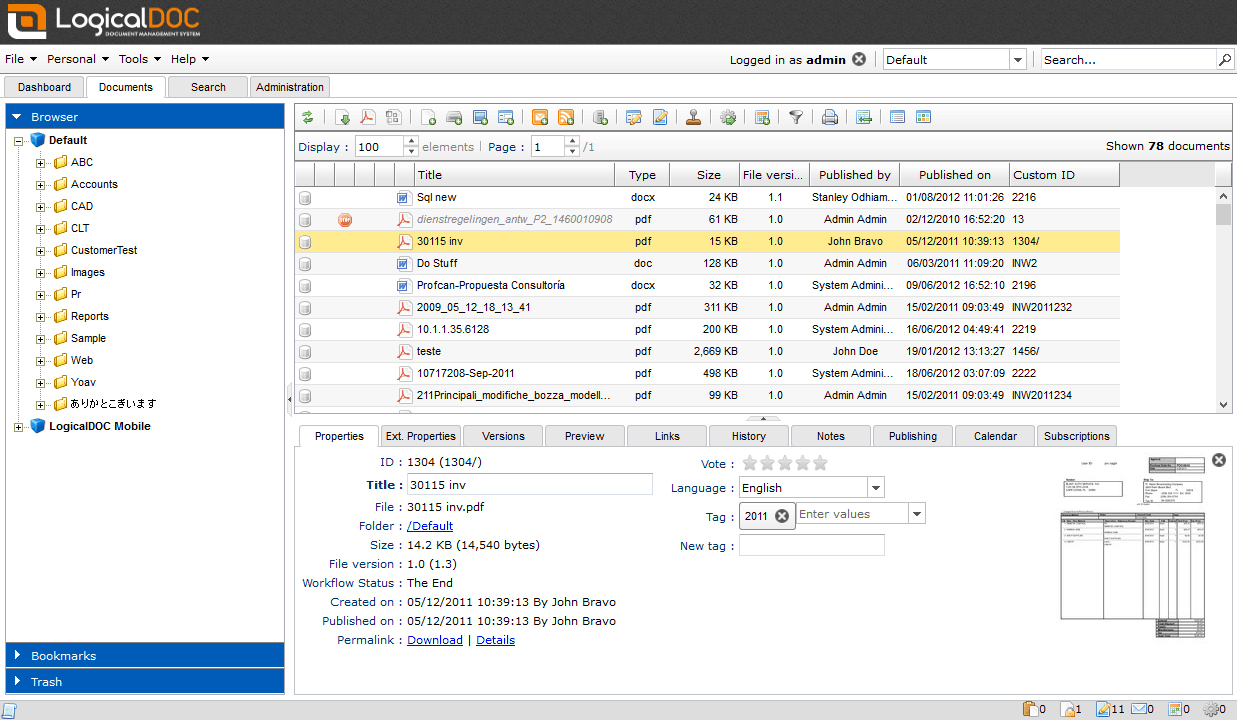
- LogicalDOC - documents browser
- Developer: LOGICALDOC Srl
- Stable release: 9.1.1 / 1 March 2025; 10 months ago
- Repository: github.com/logicaldoc/community
- Written in: Java, AJAX enabled
- Operating system: Cross-platform
- Available in: Multiple languages
- Type: ECM, Document Management System, Groupware, Content Management Systems, Open Source
- License: Commercial Edition - Proprietary; Community Edition - LGPL
- Website: www.logicaldoc.com

LogicalDOC is a proprietary cloud-based document management system that is designed to handle and share documents within an organization. LogicalDOC is a content repository, with Lucene indexing, Activiti workflow, and a set of automatic import procedures. The system was developed using Java technology.

== History ==
In 2006, two developers with experience in commercial J2EE products decided to start a business called Logical Objects, with the mission to maintain and evolve the Open Source project Contineo. After one year, Logical Objects decided to branch the old project and to start a completely new product called LogicalDOC.

In mid-2008, the first release of LogicalDOC was made available at SourceForge. The first release was numbered 3.6 in order to continue the numeration from the old project.

In the 2015 Logical Objects changed its business name to LogicalDOC, the same name of the product.

In the 2017 LogicalDOC was included by QNAP Systems, Inc. in the applications store of the QNAP devices that supports QTS v4.3 and more recent.

== License ==
LogicalDOC is a proprietary document management system.

== Usage ==
LogicalDOC is a web-based document management application, so a web browser is needed to use it. Current web browsers that have been tested for compatibility with Logical Doc include: Firefox, Internet Explorer, Safari, Google Chrome. The web interface is built using Google Web Toolkit.

== Architecture ==
LogicalDOC is developed using Java technology based on J2SE standards and the Tomcat application server. Therefore, it can be installed and executed on various platforms (Linux, Windows, Mac OS X)

The LogicalDOC architecture is based on the following technologies:

- Apache Tomcat Application Server
- Java J2SE
- GWT (Google Web Toolkit - Ajax)
- Lucene
- Spring Framework

Due to its lightweight architecture, LogicalDOC can work on a wide set of devices and can be used to implement Cloud/SaaS document management.

Data can be stored in a RDBMS (MySQL, Oracle, Microsoft SQL Server, PostgreSQL, etc.).

== General features ==
A document management system manages personal documents or business documentation, making it easier to find a previous document version. It enables searching by content, using document content indexing. LogicalDOC has currently been localized in 15 languages. LogicalDOC can be set up to support distinct full-text indexes for each supported language in order to apply specific indexing algorithms tailored to a particular language or variant.

- Document Management
- Document revisioning (minor and major revisions)
- Image Management
- Repository access via WebDAV and Web API
- Activiti workflow
- Lucene search
- Multi-language support
- Multi-platform support (Windows, Linux, Mac OS X)
- Browser-based GUI (Internet Explorer, Firefox, Google Chrome, Safari)
- Desktop integration with Microsoft Office and Microsoft Outlook
- Pluggable authentication: LDAP or Active Directory
- Multiple Database support: MySQL, PostgreSQL, Oracle, Microsoft SQL Server
- Documents full preview
- Integrated OCR and Barcode recognition
- Integrated TWAIN scanner support
- Clustering support

== Awards ==
- In the 2010 LogicalDOC won the Infoworld Bossie Awards in category: best open source applications.
- In the 2016 LogicalDOC won the CMS Critic Awards in category: Best Document Management System.

== See also ==
- Document Management
- List of content management systems
- List of collaborative software
