= ERoom =

Collaborative software product

eRoom
- Developers: eRoom Technology Inc, now a part of Opentext Corporation
- Stable release: 7.50
- Type: Collaborative software
- License: Proprietary
- Website: http://www.opentext.com

eRoom is an on-line project collaboration, or collaborative software product from Opentext Corporation. Originally developed by eRoom Technology Inc., of Cambridge, Massachusetts, product features include e-mail management, calendaring, instant messaging, project plans, databases, and document management.

The company, first called Instinctive Technology, was founded in 1996 by a group predominantly from Lotus Development Corporation (which had been acquired by IBM Corporation in 1995), and was led by CEO Jeffrey Beir.

One of eRoom's first clients was Hewlett-Packard, which became one of the first clients to use eRoom's hosted service, in which the eRoom software was run on its own servers rather than the customers' servers, for a monthly fee.

In December 2002, (announced in October) Documentum acquired eRoom Technology in a cash-and-stock transaction valued at more than $100 million. After Documentum bought eRoom Technology, Inc., they began integrating the eRoom product with their Content management platform, Documentum 5. The first integrated release, eRoom Enterprise, was released in February 2003. Version 7 of eRoom, which was released later that year, added a library of horizontal applications for audit management, deal management, customer management and project management.

In October 2003, almost a year after the eRoom acquisition, Documentum, Inc, was purchased by EMC^{2}.

On October 12, 2015, Dell Inc. announced that it would acquire EMC in a cash-and-stock deal valued at $67 billion—the largest-ever acquisition in the technology industry. The merger closed on September 7, 2016. EMC has been renamed to Dell EMC as a result of the merger.

On September 12, 2016, OpenText, acquired Dell EMC's ECD division—which included Documentum, and eRoom—for 1.6B USD.

== See also ==
- List of collaborative software
