= Insight (email client) =

Insight WebClient is a groupware email client from Bynari embedded on Arachne web browser for DOS. It supports IMAP4, POP3 and SMTP email protocol with simple settings. It allows Sunbird, Outlook, and Evolution to work together.
