= Mayan (software) =

Web-based document management system

Mayan EDMS
- Developer: Roberto Rosario
- Release: February 3, 2011; 15 years ago
- Stable release: 4.12.1 / August 21, 2026; 2 months ago
- Written in: Python
- Operating system: Cross-platform
- Platform: Docker
- Type: Document Management System, Groupware, Open source
- License: GPL-2.0-only
- Website: www.mayan-edms.com
- Repository: gitlab.com/mayan-edms/mayan-edms

Mayan (or Mayan EDMS) is a free and open-source document management system. It stores uploaded files as documents, extracts their text using optical character recognition, organises them with user-defined metadata, tags, cabinets and automatically maintained indexes, and moves them through configurable workflows. It is written in Python using the Django web framework and is distributed for deployment with Docker.

Development began in February 2011. The software was released under the Apache License 2.0 from 2014 until January 2024, when the project relicensed to version 2 of the GNU General Public License. It has been used by government agencies, universities and research collaborations, including records systems of the Tennessee Department of State, a software engineering course at Carnegie Mellon University, and the British Library's digital preservation infrastructure.

== History ==
Mayan started as a project whose only requirement was the storage of PDF files for a government agency transitioning to an all electronic registration process and has grown into a general system since then.

In August 2012, while the software was distributed under the GPL, its developer withdrew the development code from public repositories after unauthorised forks were distributed, one of them offered under a commercial licence. The Register reported the withdrawal and the accompanying list of alleged licence infringers.

Version 1.0 was released in August 2014. Version 2.0 followed in December 2015 and moved the codebase to a newer release of Django. Version 3.0, released in June 2018, rebuilt the web interface as a single-page application and moved the codebase to Django 1.11. Version 4.0, released in May 2021, separated a document's stored files from its versions, so that pages can be reordered, hidden or combined into a new version without altering the uploaded file.

In January 2024 the project changed its licence from the Apache License 2.0 to the GNU General Public License, version 2. The source code is hosted on GitLab, which is also where the project accepts issue reports and merge requests.

Version 4.12, released in August 2026, migrated the user interface from Bootstrap 3 to Bootstrap 5, added a separate colour-mode setting for light and dark interfaces, and added right-to-left interface support for languages such as Arabic, Hebrew and Persian.

=== Release history ===
Version	Release date
1.0	27 August 2014
2.0	December 2015
3.0	29 June 2018
4.0	19 May 2021
4.12	16 August 2026

== Features ==
Documents are held as one or more files, each of which may have several versions; earlier versions remain available, and page-level changes such as reordering, hiding, cropping, rotation and redaction are stored as reversible transformations rather than being written back to the uploaded file.

Documents can be uploaded through the web interface, taken from server-side directories or watched folders, retrieved from IMAP or POP3 mailboxes and cloud object storage, or captured from SANE-connected scanners and multifunction copiers. Text is extracted from uploaded pages by optical character recognition so that document contents can be searched.

Other features include user-defined metadata and document types, tags, cabinets, indexes that are rebuilt automatically from document properties, a workflow engine based on user-defined state machines, role-based permissions applied both globally and per object, check-out and check-in of documents, verification of digitally signed files, a REST API, and a localised interface. It is written in Python using the Django framework.

Reviews in the Dutch computing press have covered its versioning, optical character recognition, full-text search, tagging and workflow facilities.

== Adoption ==
=== Government ===
Records disposition authorizations published by the Tennessee Department of State record Mayan EDMS as the software used for several state records systems. These include the Tennessee Supreme Court and Tennessee Judicial Conference business and operational files held by the Administrative Office of the Courts, the client files of the Tennessee Lawyers Assistance Program, and the licensing orders of the Tennessee Board of Law Examiners.

The Government of British Columbia publishes tooling for running Mayan EDMS on its OpenShift platform as part of its Property Services Project.

The California Public Utilities Commission directs utilities filing advice letters to an Energy Division portal that runs Mayan EDMS.

A Maltese software company reported deploying Mayan EDMS on Microsoft Azure for Malta's national statistics authority following a public tender, combining it with Elasticsearch so that scanned records could be searched by their contents.

=== Research and education ===
Staff of the British Library described Mayan EDMS in a 2019 paper on the library's Integrated Preservation Suite, reporting its use as the store for the suite's policy and planning documents.

The Event Horizon Telescope collaboration published a Kubernetes deployment of Mayan EDMS in its GitHub organisation.

Carnegie Mellon University has used the Mayan EDMS codebase as the subject of its Foundations of Software Engineering course, maintaining a course-specific fork for students to work on; the course is taught at the Pittsburgh campus and at Carnegie Mellon University in Qatar.

Universiti Malaysia Sabah publishes an operating manual for its Mayan EDMS installation, mapping the system's roles and permissions onto university departments, and the University of Economics in Katowice lists an "eDMS MAYAN" service among its central information systems.

The software has also been used as a component in published system designs. A 2021 model for public-key verification of court documents in the Judiciary of Kenya used Mayan EDMS as the repository to which signed case files are pushed, A 2021 Latin American conference paper included it in a comparative review of document management tools.

== Deployment ==
The project distributes Mayan EDMS as a Docker image with a Docker Compose file as the documented installation method; the image has been published since November 2016. A Helm chart for Kubernetes deployments is also published.

== See also ==
- Document management
- List of content management systems
- List of collaborative software
