= IMail =

Method of exchanging digital messages

Invisible mail, also referred to as iMail, i-mail or Bote mail, is a method of exchanging digital messages from an author to one or more recipients in a secure and untraceable way. It is an open protocol and its java implementation (I2P-Bote) is free and open-source software, licensed under the GPLv3.

As with email, one can send and receive iMails. However, normal emails are visible to an ISP and to the administrators of the mail servers providing the service. HTTPS, or secure connections still allow the server admin to view the content of an email and its related IP number. In invisible mails both the mail's content, and the identities (of the sender as well as the receiver) remain unknown to a third party observer or attacker. Furthermore, all iMails are automatically and transparently end-to-end encrypted.

At present, iMail cannot be sent to regular email accounts. iMail addresses are called iMail destinations. They are much longer than the average email addresses and do not carry the "@" sign nor a domain. They already include the encryption key, so using an iMail destination is not harder than using standard email with gpg encryption. The destination is two in one: the "address" as well as the public key. In contrast to gpg- or pgp-encrypted emails, I2P-Bote also encrypts the mail headers.

I2P-Bote also works as an anonymous or pseudonymous remailer. iMails are sent via the I2P network, a secure and pseudonymous p2p overlay network on the internet and sender and receiver need not be online at the same time (store-and-forward model). The entire system is serverless and fully distributed. iMail peers accept, forward, store and deliver messages. Neither the users nor their computers are required to be online simultaneously; they need connect only briefly for as long as it takes to send or receive messages.

An iMail message consists of three components, the message envelope, the message header, and the message body. The message header contains control information, including, minimally one or more recipient addresses. Usually descriptive information is also added, such as a subject header field and a message submission date/time stamp.

iMails can carry international typesets and have small multi-media content attachments, a process standardized in RFC 2045 through 2049. Collectively, these RFCs have come to be called Multipurpose Internet Mail Extensions (MIME).

== Features ==
- secure messages: All iMail messages are automatically end-to-end encrypted from the sender to the receiver.
- message authentication: All iMail messages that are not sent without any information on the originator are automatically signed and the message's integrity and authenticity is checked by the receiver.
- anonymous messages: iMails can also be sent without any information about the originator.

=== Attachment size limitations ===
iMail messages may have one or more attachments. Attachments serve the purpose of delivering binary or text files of unspecified size. In principle there is no technical intrinsic restriction in the I2P-Bote protocol limiting the size or number of attachments. In practice, however, the slow speeds, overheads and data volume due to redundancy limit the viable size of files or the size of an entire message.

=== Email spoofing ===
Email spoofing occurs when the header information of an email is altered to make the message appear to come from a known or trusted source. In the case of iMails, this is countered by cryptographically signing each iMail with its originator's key.

=== Tracking of sent mails ===
The I2P-Bote mail service provides no mechanisms for tracking a transmitted message, but a means to verify that it has been delivered, which however does not necessarily mean it has been read.

=== Drawbacks ===
iMails can only be received or sent via the web interface, there is no implementation of POP3 or SMTP for iMail yet. Furthermore, there are no bridges that allow for sending from I2P-Bote to a standard internet email account or vice versa.

== See also ==
=== Related services ===
- Email
- I2P
- Data security
- Email encryption
- Email client, Comparison of email clients
- Email hosting service
- Internet mail standards
- Mail transfer agent
- Mail user agent
- Unicode and email
- Webmail
- Anonymous remailer
- Disposable email address
- Email encryption
- Email tracking
- Electronic mailing list
- Mailing list archive

=== Protocols ===
- IMAP
- POP3
- SMTP
- UUCP
- X400
