= Cyn.in =

- Developer: Cynapse
- Stable release: 3.1.3 / April 28, 2010; 16 years ago
- Written in: Python
- Operating system: Cross-platform
- Type: Collaborative software
- License: GNU GPL version 3
- Website: www.cynapse.com

Cyn.in is an open-source enterprise collaborative software built on top of Plone a content management system written in the Python programming language which is a layer above Zope. Cyn.in is developed by Cynapse a company founded by Apurva Roy Choudhury and Dhiraj Gupta which is based in India. Cyn.in enables its users to store, retrieve and organize files and rich content in a collaborative, multiuser environment.

Cyn.in comes in three flavors. Cyn.in Community Edition is released under the GNU General Public License version 3 based on open standards and is completely "free" to use. Cyn.in Enterprise Editions are commercially supported, certified and tested by Cynapse. The on-premises appliance is designed towards businesses who want to install the software on their infrastructure behind their firewall. With the On-Demand Service, Cynapse hosts the software for businesses to use, in secure cloud servers.

== History ==
Cyn.in was developed and released in late 2006 as a closed source Enterprise Bliki software, based on the .NET Framework as a SaaS offering by Cynapse. In 2008, June, Cynapse, the company behind Cyn.in, released a new version of Cyn.in and open sourced the project. This release was built on the popular open source Plone - Zope - Python framework. With this release Cynapse's intention was to expand its focus into the enterprise collaboration domain. While the new release still supported Blogs and Wikis, Cyn.in had evolved to include enterprise collaboration tools including file repositories, event calendars, image galleries and more. The company decided to discontinue using the Bliki terminology and Cyn.in is called a Collaboration software

== Concepts ==
=== Application convergence ===
The cyn.in collaborative information management system attempts to bring together the core concepts of:

- Personal information management
- Organization-wide knowledge and document management
- Information and file collaboration
- Knowledge transfer
- Content publishing

=== Spaces ===
Information can be made available in four different location namespaces, called Personal Space, Shared Space, Intranet Space and Web Space within the cyn.in application. Each Space has distinct authorization and functionality rules, for example, the Intranet Space of a cyn.in site may only be accessed by members of it, in contrast to the Web Space, where public Internet access is allowed.

=== Notes ===
Information and files in cyn.in are stored together in a common container format called a Note. A user can create any number of Notes in the system, however a Note can only reside in one Space at a time.

=== Taxonomy and categorization ===
Notes can have one or more SlashTags. SlashTags is the name given to the hierarchical tagging system used in cyn.in to categorize Notes and is used for creation of navigation trees and dynamic pop-out menus. SlashTags offer taxonomical advantages when compared to traditional folder based systems because they enable:

- direct navigational access to each Note
- multiple presences of the same Note in the navigation system

== Key Features ==
Due to the emergent nature of the open source and hosted service model, the exact feature specification of the cyn.in service is updated regularly. The following core features are currently visible:

- Wiki support
- Blog support
- Calendaring
- Microblogging
- Bookmark Directories
- Discussion Boards
- Audio and Video Galleries
- File Repositories
- Image Galleries and slideshow views of images
- Collaboration Spaces
- Customizable Permissions and Access control
- Integrated WYSIWYG Word Processor
- WYSIWYG creation and editing of HTML content tables
- Content Ratings
- Content Tagging support
- People Directory
- Working Copy support
- Link and reference integrity maintenance
- Automatic locking and unlocking
- Complete revision history of all content and files
- Workflow capabilities
- Integrated Full Text indexing of (Word, Excel, PowerPoint, PDF, HTML, Text and other file formats)
- Rules engine for content
- Auto-generated tables of contents
- Multi-file uploads
- Live Search
- Faceted Search
- i18n support
- Accessibility compliant
- Time-based publishing and expiry of content
- Standards-compliant XHTML and CSS
- RSS syndication of content and files
- Automatic image scaling and thumbnail generation
- Cross-platform
- Comment capabilities on any content
- WebDAV support
- Backup support
- Cut/copy/paste operations on content
- Email notifications
- Desktop Client
- Automatic Backlinking
- Granular rights based content editing and user-to-user collaboration
- Access rights based AJAX user interface
- Co - author rich content, files and documents
- Selectively move content from private to public spaces
- Sensible, easy-to-remember URLs
- Server based image resizing for preview and download

== Applications ==
Designed to be used generically, the cyn.in bliki service can be applied in the following business applications:

- Knowledge management
- Document management
- Enterprise content management
- Digital asset management
- Online file system
- Version control system
- Group Collaboration

== Pricing model ==
The cyn.in service is made available for purchase by businesses in the Software-as-a-Service (SaaS) model at a flexible per user cost. cyn.in is a multi-tenant system; each customer of cyn.in may purchase one or more cyn.in sites each of which are located at a user selectable subdomain of the main cyn.in service. Each site allows a set of users to log into it to access internal functionality; the service offers a central user authentication system and thus allows the same users to be members of different cyn.in sites as well.

A free version is also available for individual professionals with some limitations in storage and the maximum number of users that are allowed.

== Awards ==
- 2009
  - Les Tropées du Libre (nominee)
  - SourceForge Community Choice Awards - Finalist in 3 categories - Best New Project, Best Commercial Open Source Project & Best Visual Design

== See also ==
- Enterprise social software
- List of collaborative software
- List of content management systems
