= Bynari =

Bynari, Inc.
- Type: Email Software
- Industry: Software
- Founded: 1999
- Headquarters: Dallas, Texas, USA
- Area served: Worldwide
- Products: Insight Family
- Website: www.bynari.net

Bynari is a defunct company based in Dallas, developing server and email software, mainly known for its Insight Family, similar to Microsoft Exchange Server with Outlook.

Development of the products is a joint effort with various OEM partners.

== Insight Family ==
Bynari's products support various email clients. Microsoft Outlook, Novell Evolution, and Mozilla Sunbird are used for groupware sharing with the current products.

Bynari's products consist of:

- Insight Server is an email server that supports Linux and SCO's Open Server operating systems.
- Insight Connector provides Outlook sharing for IMAP servers like Cyrus IMAP server, Courier Mail Server, Kolab and Insight Server.
- Insight Addressbook allows Outlook contacts sharing with LDAP servers.
- Insight Client is the web mail client, provides web browser access and shares calendars, contacts, folders and tasks with desktop clients.

=== Insight Server ===
Insight Server, formerly known as TradeXCH, is mostly a suite of many open source applications using components of Cyrus IMAP, Exim, Postfix, Berkeley DB, OpenLDAP, Apache, and ProFTP. Bynari has developed a web interface for administrating the different applications.

It was the first commercial web server based on the open source software Kolab version 1. A version based on Kolab 2 was canceled, because of Kolab's change of storing the data. It also uses Spamassassin, Clamav, and AMaViS for security. It conforms to open standards: SyncML, GroupDAV, CalDAV, and WebDAV. The middleware products are developed by Bynari and provide groupware sharing with calendars, contacts, and tasks.

=== Insight Connector ===
The Insight Connector is a server that works like a Microsoft Exchange Server, but using IMAP and a Microsoft Outlook plugin. The server also supports MAPI Message Store Provider and thus being able to edit and change the groupware-Data "live and online" using any IMAP server. The server is also used by IBM serving over 4.600 companies.
