= Simple Groupware =

- Developer: Thomas Bley (Simple Groupware Solutions)
- Stable release: 0.745 / March 2012
- Operating system: Linux, Windows, Mac OS X, etc.
- Type: Groupware
- License: GPL

Simple Groupware is a groupware package written in PHP. It uses the MySQL database (version 4 or higher). It contains a calendar system, an email client, an inventory system, and a number of other features. Simple Groupware is free software released under the GNU General Public License.

The software contains about 30,000 lines of code and uses about 150,000 lines of code from other free projects. It has modules for managing calendars, contacts, tasks, projects, and inventories of equipment. External data can be integrated using IMAP, RSS, iCal, vCard, CSV or XML files. Firefox bookmark files are also supported. Data can be exported in the CSV, XML, HTML, RSS, and iCal formats.

The modules consist of traditional PHP code which is responsible for reading data from the data source into an array. The presentation (displaying, sorting, filtering, linking, editing, etc.) is specified in "sgsML" (Simple Groupware Solutions Markup Language). sgsML allows web applications to be implemented faster and with less work than would be possible in, for example, PHP. By reducing the amount of code, applications can be changed quickly and be more readily checked for bugs and consistency.

The first release was published on December 13, 2004, at SourceForge.
