= MAPI =

Microsoft Windows email API

Messaging Application Programming Interface (MAPI) is an API for Microsoft Windows which allows programs to become email-aware. While MAPI is designed to be independent of the protocol, it is usually used to communicate with Microsoft Exchange Server.

== Details ==
MAPI uses functions loosely based on the X.400 XAPIA standard. It includes facilities to access message transports, message stores, and directories.

While Simple MAPI (SMAPI) is a subset of 12 functions which enable developers to add basic messaging functionality, Extended MAPI (EMAPI) allows complete control over the messaging system on the client computer. This includes creation and management of messages, plus management of the client mailbox, and service providers.

Simple MAPI is included with Microsoft Windows as part of Outlook Express/Windows Mail while the full Extended MAPI is included with Microsoft Outlook and Exchange.

In addition to the Extended MAPI client interface, programming calls can be made indirectly through the Simple MAPI API client interface, through the Common Messaging Calls (CMC) API client interface, or by the object-based CDO Library interface. These three methods are easier to use and designed for less complex messaging-enabled and -aware applications. (Simple MAPI and CMC were removed from Exchange 2003.)

MAPI was originally designed by Microsoft. The company founded its MS Mail team in 1987, but it was not until it acquired Consumers Software in 1991 to obtain Network Courier that it had a messaging product. Reworked, it was sold as MS PC Mail (or Microsoft Mail for PC Networking). The basic API to MS PC Mail was later known as MAPI version 0 (or MAPI0), to differentiate it from "true" MAPI.

== Service provider interface ==
The full Extended MAPI interface is required for interfacing messaging-based services to client applications such as Outlook. For example, several non-Microsoft e-mail server product vendors created "MAPI service providers" to allow their products to be accessed via Outlook. Notable examples include Axigen Mail Server, Kerio Connect, Scalix, Zimbra, HP OpenMail, IBM Lotus Notes, Zarafa/Kopano, and Bynari.

MAPI also had a service provider interface of sorts. Microsoft used this to interface MS Mail to an email system based on Xenix, for internal use.

Extended MAPI is the main e-mail data access method used by Outlook, to interface to Microsoft Exchange, via MAPI service providers shipped with Outlook.

== MAPI/RPC protocol details ==
Microsoft has released full details of the MAPI/RPC protocol since August 2007.

"MAPI protocol" is a colloquial name for the MAPI/RPC. At times, Microsoft has also called it "Exchange RPC" and "Outlook-Exchange Transport Protocol".

Microsoft provides a sample MAPI/RPC-based application called MFCMAPI to assist developers. It is also widely used as a diagnostics tool by both developers and Microsoft Exchange administrators.

== MAPI over HTTP ==
The original implementation was designed for use on a local network, or LAN.

With Exchange 2003 and Outlook 2010, Microsoft introduced RPC over HTTP (later renamed Outlook Anywhere) as a way to Exchange over the internet.

In 2014, Exchange 2013 SP1 introduced another variant, this time with a more "normal" HTTP-based stack known as "MAPI over HTTP".

== Incompatibility with Internet Mail ==
The Simple Mail Transfer Protocol has always supported the concept of mail with multiple authors, and distinguishes between the "sender" and "authors" whenever there is more than one of the latter. MAPI cannot represent separate authors and senders except through the delegation mechanism, which does not permit more than one author. Thus MAPI cannot accurately transmit group letters from scientific communities to legislators, or presentation of group research via email, or similar scenarios. When fully SMTP compliant mailers (e.g. Thunderbird) send perfectly formed SMTP messages with multiple authors into MAPI-dependent email infrastructures (such as Exchange/Outlook, O365, or Outlook.com) the messages must have their information density reduced to fit MAPI, presenting challenges for authentication and anti-spoofing technologies that rely on accurate message metadata transmission, and fundamentally changing messages to be something other than what was originally sent. Although the security implications impact all users, inability to represent multiple authorship is generally of little concern in purely hierarchical settings such as traditional businesses and military organizations, primarily impacting legislative and academic institutions.

== Reimplementations ==
Several open-source software projects have started working on implementing MAPI libraries, including:

- Grommunio/Gromox has C++20 implementations of MAPI/RPC and MAPI/HTTP servers.
- The OpenMapi project (now demised) had a C# implementation.
- Kopano Groupware Core has a C++11 implementation called "mapi4linux" (continuation of the same from Zarafa), which offers an API that is source-backwards-compatible with the Messaging API (code written for M4L also build with the Windows SDK). Kopano GWC comes with a connector for the Zarafa/Kopano-based SOAP/HTTP transport.
- OpenChange has a "libmapi" component written in C that only partially resembles MAPI. (Lacks interfaces like IMsgStore, the OpenEntry function.)
- The OpenChange subproject Evolution-MAPI is a connector for Exchange implementing the MAPI/RPC transport.
- The GNOME Evolution project develops evolution-ews, which has implemented much of MAPI.
