= Nefsis =

American communications company

Nefsis Corporation
- Type: Private
- Industry: Videoconferencing; Web Conferencing
- Founded: 1998
- Headquarters: San Diego, CA, United States
- Area served: Worldwide
- Key people: Allen Drennan, Founder, CTO; Steven Peltier, CEO
- Website: www.nefsis.com

Nefsis Corporation is a communications technology company. It was an early developer of real-time communications software and the first to use cloud computing in the videoconferencing industry.

Nefsis offers multipoint video conferencing with integrated voice and live collaboration solutions for small to medium-sized business and distributed enterprise customers.

== History ==
Nefsis was founded in 1998 by Allen Drennan as WiredRed Corporation. The company name was changed to Nefsis Corporation in 2010.

In 1998 through 2000 the company developed and sold a VPN-like, full-duplex, multipoint communications software product called e/pop that supported several applications including presence management, instant messaging, multiparty VoIP, and remote control.

In 2001 the company introduced version 3 of its e/pop software, including server-to-server pipes, providing a unique method of relaying presence status and secure instant messaging across firewalls and proxies in multi-office, distributed networks. e/pop v3.0 received Network Computing Editor's Choice award in September, 2004, for enterprise instant messaging due in part to its secure multi-office capabilities.

The company's real-time software technology was distributed under OEM license by Sony Online Entertainment in 2003 as the multipoint VoIP software engine in the PlanetSide multiplayer online game. Commencing 2004, NewHeights Software Corporation licensed the company's technology to power presence, IM, and web conferencing features in several softphone products sold under the NewHeights and Mitel brands. These OEM integrations were noteworthy at the time as they added multipoint VoIP and web conferencing to these online gaming and softphone applications, respectively.

In May, 2004, the company added multipoint video as another feature of its on-premises, web conferencing software products.

In 2005 the company started offering its software under hosted service agreements (software-as-a-service). After several years in development, the company introduced cloud computing and parallel processing technology to its customers commencing in 2008. The new video conferencing online service was introduced under the Nefsis brand, which later became the company name.

The company was cited by European CEO Magazine and market research firm Frost & Sullivan in 2009 as the first to use cloud computing in a multipoint video conferencing online service.

Nefsis has been used for corporate video conferencing and online meetings, as a business continuity tool during inclement weather, and in specialty applications such as training, telemedicine, video arraignment, and video remote interpreting among others.

In 2011, Nefsis was acquired by Brother Industries.
