= Wrike =

Project management software

- Developers: Wrike, Inc.
- Release: 2006
- Platform: Web, iOS, and Android
- Available in: 9 languages
- List of languages English, Spanish, Portuguese, French, German, Italian, Russian, Japanese and Mandarin
- Type: Project management software, collaboration software and productivity software
- Website: www.wrike.com

Wrike, Inc. is an American project management application service provider based in San Jose, California. Wrike also has offices in India, Dallas, Tallinn, Nicosia, Dublin, Tokyo, Melbourne, and Prague.

== History ==
Wrike was founded in 2006 by Andrew Filev. Currently CEO at Wrike is Thomas Scott. Filev initially self-funded the company before later obtaining investor funding. Wrike released the beta version of its software (also called Wrike) in December 2006. The company then launched a new "Enterprise" platform in December 2013.

In June 2015, Wrike announced the opening of an office in Dublin, Ireland and in 2016, Wrike launched a datacenter there to host data in compliance with local privacy regulations. In July 2016, Wrike announced the launch of Wrike for Marketers. That same year, Wrike's headquarters moved from Mountain View to San Jose, California.

In January 2021, Citrix Systems announced its intention to acquire Wrike for $2.25 billion. The acquisition closed in March 2021.

On January 31, 2022, it was announced that Citrix had been acquired in a $16.5 billion deal by affiliates of Vista Equity Partners and Evergreen Coast Capital. Citrix would merge with TIBCO Software, a Vista portfolio company to form Cloud Software Group (CSG). In September 2022, Wrike separated from Citrix Systems.

In July 2023, Vista transferred ownership to Symphony Technology Group.

== Investments ==
Wrike received $1 million in Angel funding in 2012 from TMT Investments. In October, 2013, Wrike secured $10 million in investment funding from Bain Capital. In May 2015, the company secured $15 million in a new round of funding. Investors included Scale Venture Partners, DCM Ventures, and Bain Capital. At that time, Wrike had 8,000 customers, 200 employees, and 30,000 new users each month.

On November 29, 2018, Wrike signed a definitive agreement to receive a majority investment by Vista Equity Partners (“Vista”), a firm focused on software, data and technology-enabled businesses.

== Software ==
The Wrike project management software is a Software-as-a-Service (SaaS) product with tools for managing projects, deadlines, schedules, and workflow processes. It includes collaboration features. The application is available in English, French, Spanish, German, Portuguese, Italian, Japanese and Russian. Wrike has triggers for task automation in workflow management.

=== Features ===
Wrike features a multi-pane UI and consists of features in two categories: project management, and team collaboration. According to Wrike, project management features are designed to help teams track dates and dependencies associated with projects, manage assignments and resources, and track time. These include an interactive Gantt chart, a workload view, and a sortable table that can be customized to store project data.

The software includes a co-editing tool, discussion threads on tasks, and tools for attaching documents, editing them, and tracking their changes. Wrike uses an "inbox" feature and browser notifications to alert users of updates from their colleagues and dashboards for quick overviews of pending tasks. These updates are also available in Wrike's mobile apps on iOS and Android. Wrike has an optional feature set called "Wrike for Marketers" which has several tools for managing marketing workflows.

In May 2012, Wrike announced the launch of a freemium version of its software for teams of up to 5 users. That year also saw the integration of a live text coeditor into its workspace to unify collaboration and task management. In late 2013 Wrike released a new feature set called Wrike Enterprise which included advanced analytics and other tools targeted at large business customers. Since then it has released several major updates to Wrike Enterprise, including a customizable spreadsheet called "Dynamic Platform" in late 2014 and custom workflows for teams in 2015. In July 2016, Wrike was updated with a set of add-on features under the name "Wrike for Marketers," which includes integrations with Adobe Photoshop, a tool for submitting requests, and proofing and approval tools for creative assets like videos and images.

Wrike is available as native Android and iOS apps. Mobile apps include an interactive Gantt chart that syncs across devices. The apps are available offline, and sync when connection is restored.

=== Criticism ===
Critics said new users may have a learning curve with complex features. Wrike has 2,710 customers for an estimated 0.04% market share.

Competitors include Google Workspace, Slack (software), and Quip (software).

== See also ==
- Comparison of project management software
- Comparison of time-tracking software
- List of collaborative software
- List of project management software
