= Application sharing =

Application sharing is an element of remote access, falling under the collaborative software umbrella, that enables two or more users to access a shared application or document from their respective computers simultaneously in real time. Generally, the shared application or document will be running on a host computer, and remote access to the shared content will be provided to other users by the host user. To transfer one application from one computer to another, the application must reside on only one of the machines connected with each other.

== Granting access ==
Access is typically granted in one of three ways, depending on the architecture of the application sharing software.

1. If the software allows the shared content to be accessed from the web, the host user will usually define and provide a username/password combination to the remote users he/she wishes to grant access to; they can then enter the log-in information on the appropriate website and access the shared material. One example of software that features application sharing in this manner is Qnext.

2. If the software is required on both ends to access the shared content, granting access will be governed by the mechanisms of that particular software, but will usually require some sort of user authentication as well. One example of software that features application sharing in this manner is MSN Messenger.

3. The shared content (being an application or entire desktop) can be accessed using a permission based software approach. This technique helps to ensure that the application or desktop being controlled cannot be accessed without direct live approval, helping to eliminate the security risk of taking control of a desktop when the user is not present.

== Type of access ==
Once the applications or documents to be shared and whom they are to be shared with have been determined, there are generally two types of access that can be granted to remote users.

1. Control access – the host user allows remote users to actually control, edit, and manipulate the shared content; most application sharing software allows the host to revoke control access at any time. During the remote control session, keyboard and mouse are remotely controlled. Usually a hot key is provided to revoke access.

2. View access – the host user only allows remote users to passively view the shared content; remote users have no ability to edit or effect change in the shared content whatsoever.

== Uses ==
1. Control access – this configuration is most widely used to facilitate collaboration by virtual teams. Team members can collaborate on the same document, making instantly apparent changes in real-time.

Application sharing has been included in every version of Windows live messenger since 8.1 except for 8.2.

== See also ==
- Collaborative software
- Remote Assistance Software
- Remote desktop software
- Open-Xchange
