= Redmine =

Computer bug tracking software

- Developer: Jean-Philippe Lang
- Release: June 25, 2006; 20 years ago
- Stable release: 7.0 (June 30, 2026; 44 days ago) [±]
- Written in: Ruby
- Operating system: Unix, Linux, macOS, Windows
- Platform: Ruby on Rails
- Available in: 49 languages
- List of languages Albanian, Arabic, Azerbaijani, Basque, Bosnian, Bulgarian, Catalan, Croatian, Czech, Danish, Dutch, English, English (British), Estonian, Finnish, French, Galician, German, Greek, Hebrew, Hungarian, Indonesian, Italian, Japanese, Korean, Latvian, Lithuanian, Macedonian, Mongolian, Norwegian, Persian, Polish, Portuguese, Portuguese (Brazil), Romanian, Russian, Serbian, Serbian Cyrillic, Simplified Chinese, Slovak, Slovene, Spanish, Spanish (Panama), Swedish, Thai, Traditional Chinese, Turkish, Ukrainian, Vietnamese
- Type: Project management software, Bug tracking system
- License: GNU General Public License, version 2.0
- Website: www.redmine.org
- Repository: www.redmine.org/projects/redmine/repository/svn

Redmine is a free and open source, web-based project management and issue tracking tool. It allows users to manage multiple projects and associated subprojects. It features per-project wikis and forums, time tracking, and flexible, role-based access control. It includes a calendar and Gantt charts to aid visual representation of projects and their deadlines. Redmine integrates with various version control systems and includes a repository browser and diff viewer.

The design of Redmine is significantly influenced by Trac, a software package with some similar features.

Redmine is written using the Ruby on Rails framework. It is cross-platform and cross-database and supports 49 languages.

== Features ==
Redmine includes a wide range of features designed to support project management and collaboration. It enables tracking of multiple projects simultaneously and offers flexible, role-based access control. The platform incorporates an issue tracking system, Gantt chart, and a calendar, along with integrated tools for managing news, documents, and files. Users can receive updates through web feeds and email notifications. Each project can have its own wiki and forum, and the system also supports basic time tracking. Redmine allows the creation of custom fields for issues, time entries, projects, and users. It integrates with various source code management systems such as Subversion (SVN, CVS, Git, Mercurial, Bazaar, and Darcs). Additional features include support for multiple LDAP authentication, user self-registration, compatibility with 49 languages, support for multiple databases, plugin extensions, and a REST API for external integrations.

== Adoption ==
As of 2008, there were more than 80 major Redmine installations worldwide. Among the users of Redmine is Ruby. In 2015, Redmine was the most popular open source project planning tool.

== Forks ==
Following concerns with the way the feedback and patches from the Redmine community were being handled a group of Redmine developers created a fork of the project in February 2011. The fork was initially named Bluemine, but changed to ChiliProject. After the leader of the fork moved on from ChiliProject in 2012 and development and maintenance had been announced to shut down, the project was officially discontinued in February 2015.

Another fork of ChiliProject called OpenProject is active since 2015.

Additionally, Easy Redmine (also known as Easy Project), developed by Easy Software, functions as an extension to Redmine. Established in 2006, Easy Redmine offers enhanced features and a mobile application and is available in over 80 countries. It covers various project management methodologies and integrates advanced functionalities like risk and resource management, Gantt charts, and CRM modules. Easy Redmine is being used by the Kazakh state administration, Bosch, and the Ministry of Foreign Affairs of the Czech Republic among others.

== See also ==
- Comparison of issue-tracking systems
- Comparison of project management software
- Comparison of time-tracking software
- Software configuration management

== Sources ==
- Lesyuk, Andriy (2013). Mastering Redmine. Packt Publishing. ISBN 978-1-849519-14-4.
- Bevilacqua, Alex (2014). Redmine Plugin Extension and Development. Packt Publishing. ISBN 978-1-783288-74-8.
