= Easy8 =

- Other names: Easy Redmine, Easy Project
- Developer: Easy8 Group
- Release: 2007
- Stable release: v16 / September 2026
- Written in: Ruby on Rails, Vue.js
- Type: On-premises software; Project management software; Collaboration software
- License: Proprietary, parts are open source
- Website: www.easy8.com

Easy8 is a WorkOps platform for project management and work management, developed by the Czech company Easy8 s.r.o., based in Prague. Formerly known as Easy Redmine, it extends the open-source Redmine system. The software was first sold commercially in 2007 and was also marketed as Easy Project.

The platform supports waterfall and agile project management and can be extended with modules for resource management, financial management, customer relationship management and helpdesk support. It is available as a cloud service or for deployment on users' own servers. In 2021, the software was used by businesses, universities and public authorities internationally, including Kazakhstan's state administration.

== History ==
The software originated in the website-development work of Filip Morávek and his colleagues. To manage their own projects, they used the open-source system Redmine, which they adapted to their needs. In 2007, they began selling the modified software commercially.

Early versions focused primarily on project finances, before broader project-management functions were added. In 2010, the company made its first foreign sale in the Netherlands. The company subsequently closed its website-development division to concentrate on Easy Redmine and Easy Project. By 2021, both products were marketed as identical but aimed at different audiences: Easy Redmine at businesses familiar with Redmine, and Easy Project at those beginning to use advanced project management.

By December 2021, more than 3,500 companies and organisations had tried the two products, and approximately 80 percent of the company's customers were outside the Czech Republic.

Following Russia's invasion of Ukraine in 2022, the company withdrew from the Russian market. Morávek later said that it had notified customers that it would wind down cooperation over six months.

Easy Redmine was later renamed Easy8. On 25 March 2026, Easy Software s.r.o. changed its registered name to Easy8 s.r.o.

== Overview ==
Easy8 supports waterfall and agile project management within one platform. Users can divide projects into tasks, assign them to team members and monitor their progress and project finances. Planning tools include Gantt charts and mind maps.

Additional functions are available through extensions for resource management, risk management, financial management, customer relationship management and helpdesk support. Features documented for Easy Project in 2020 included work breakdown structures, earned value management and time recording. Resource-management tools supported assigning work according to staff availability, while financial tools included project budgets and cost tracking. The CRM module included contact and sales-opportunity management.

Easy8 is based on the open-source Redmine system. It is available through cloud hosting or installation on users' own servers, including deployment in environments disconnected from the internet. Users can move between these deployment models. Microsoft provides a connector for integrating the platform with Power Automate, Power Apps and Logic Apps. The platform also supports integration with n8n through a connector developed by Easy8.

In 2021, users of the software included Bosch, Zentiva and the Czech Ministry of Foreign Affairs. A 2022 case study of the Turkish Statistical Institute described its use of Easy Redmine extensions to address limitations of the open-source Redmine software. The institute also developed an in-house application using Redmine's API to meet additional monitoring and reporting requirements.

== Easy AI ==
Easy AI is an artificial intelligence extension for Easy8. Its assistants support document searches, text drafting, task summarisation, project planning, status reporting and helpdesk ticket management.

In a 2026 bachelor's thesis at Brno University of Technology, Ondřej Bojko tested the assistants in Easy Project version 15.6.2. He reported successful information retrieval and discussion summarisation, but identified inaccurate cost estimates and delayed updates to status reports.

== License ==
Easy8 includes software based on Redmine distributed under the GNU GPLv2, alongside components covered by other open-source licences and the proprietary Easy8 Commercial License. Customers using the on-premises version can obtain source code for licensed components, whereas the cloud service does not provide customers with access to its source code. The commercial licence restricts redistribution of the components it covers without prior written consent.
