= Data conferencing =

Data conferencing refers to a communication session among two or more participants sharing computer data in real time. Interaction and presentation devices such as a screen, keyboard, mouse, camera, etc. can be shared or be able to control each other computer. It is used to distinguish from video conferencing and audio conferencing.

The data can include screen, documents, graphics, drawings and applications that can be seen, annotated or manipulated by participants.

== See also ==
- Comparison of remote desktop software
- Remote Desktop Protocol
- Virtual Network Computing (VNC)
- Web Conferencing
