= Document collaboration =

Several people working on a shared document

Document and file collaboration are the tools or systems set up to help multiple people work together on a single document or file to achieve a single final version. Normally, it is the software that allows teams to work on a single document, such as a word processor document, at the same time from different computer terminals or mobile devices. Hence, document or file collaboration today is a system allowing people to collaborate across different locations using an Internet, or "cloud", enabled approach such as for Wikis such as Wikipedia.

== Overview ==
Document collaboration in a general sense simply refers to more than one person co-authoring a document. However, most people today when talking about document collaboration are referring to (generally internet based) methods for a team of workers to work together on an electronic document from computer terminals based anywhere in the world.

Early online document collaboration used email, whereby comments would be written in the email with the document attached. The problem was that this was not a document-centric solution (i.e. Comments and discussions around the document were separate from the document itself). Today, the best document collaboration tools are more document-centric. These systems provide a user with a document-centric collaboration experience because they allow users to tag the document and add content specific comments, maintaining a complete version history and records and storing all comments and activities associated around a document. For this reason, an increasing number of firms are using email less and file sharing and document collaboration tools more.

Most collaboration systems require a server computer, which maintains copies of the documents for remote access. The server computer may be operated by the organization owning the documents, or outsourced to some service. The latter is often referred to as cloud computing.

== Typical features ==
- Real-time commenting and instant messaging features to enhance speed of project delivery
- Presence indicators to identify when others are active on documents owned by another person
- Permissions
- Personal activity feeds and email alert profiles to keep abreast of latest activities per file or user
- Ability to collaborate and share files with users outside the company firewall
- Company security and compliance framework
- Change history of files and documents
- Ability to handle large files
- Approval Workflow

== Notable document collaboration software ==
- List of collaborative software
- Collaborative real-time editor
