= CoWord =

Software add-on to Microsoft Word

- A CoWord editing session with 2 users
- Developer(s): Advanced ậCollaborative Technology Research
- Stable release: 1.0 / May 15, 2007
- Operating system: Windows
- Type: Word Processor
- License: Free
- Website: cooffice.ntu.edu.sg/coword

CoWord is a software add-on to Microsoft Word to enable multiple users to edit the same document over the Internet with MS Word. It is a part of the CoOffice suite of collaboration tools for Microsoft Office.

CoWord can be considered as a collaborative real-time editor, with the editor being MS Word (which is not distributed with CoWord). To use CoWord, users need to supply their own copies of MS Word.

As of August 2010, CoWord has become CodoxWord, released by CodoxWare.

== Technology ==
One of the main challenges in building collaborative real-time editors is in concurrency control. The concurrency control technology used by CoWord is Operational transformation. Operational transformation (OT) can incorporate concurrent changes made to replicas of the same document. This means systems built with OT allow multiple users to make concurrent changes to the document, and all changes will be incorporated. Other known systems based on Operational transformation are: ACE, Gobby, and Subethaedit.

In CoWord, OT is implemented in a module called Generic Collaborative Engine (GCE). GCE is also provided as a library package, allowing other developers to create real-time collaborative editing systems without having to implement OT.
