= Etherpad =

Open-source web-based collaborative real-time editor

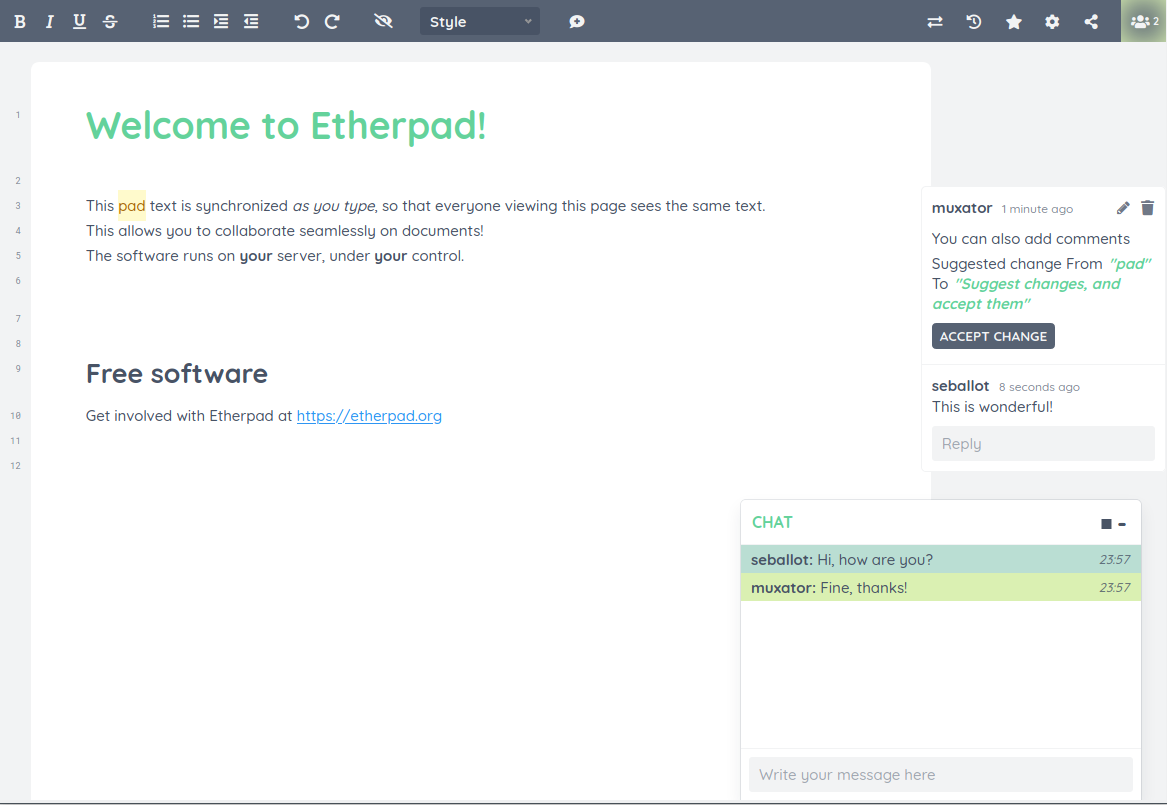
- Etherpad 1.8.4 with two plugins enabled
- Developer: Etherpad Foundation
- Release: November 2008; 17 years ago
- Stable release: 3.3.7 / 5 October 2026; 2 days ago
- Written in: JavaScript (Node.js)
- Operating system: Cross-platform
- Available in: English
- Type: Collaborative real-time editor
- License: Apache License 2.0
- Website: etherpad.org
- Repository: github.com/ether/etherpad

Etherpad (previously known as EtherPad) is an open-source, web-based collaborative real-time editor, allowing authors to simultaneously edit a text document, and see all of the participants' edits in real-time, with the ability to display each author's text in their own color. There is also a chat box in the sidebar to allow meta communication.

First launched in November 2008, the software was acquired by Google in December 2009, and released as open source later that month. Further development is coordinated by the Etherpad Foundation.

== Features and implementation ==
Anyone can create a new collaborative document, known as a "pad". Each pad has its own URL, and anyone who knows this URL can edit the pad and participate in the associated chats. Password-protected pads are also possible. Each participant is identified by a color and a name.

The software auto-saves the document at regular, short intervals, but participants can permanently save specific versions (checkpoints) at any time. Merging of changes is handled by operational transform. A "time slider" feature allows anyone to explore the history of the pad. The document can be downloaded in plain text, HTML, Open Document, Microsoft Word, or PDF format.

Automated markup of JavaScript code was made available shortly after the launch.

Etherpad itself is implemented in JavaScript, on top of the AppJet platform, with the real-time functionality achieved through Comet streaming. At the time of its launch, Etherpad was the first web application of its kind to achieve true real-time performance, a feat previously only achieved by desktop applications such as SubEthaEdit (for Mac), Gobby, or MoonEdit (both cross-platform). Existing collaborative web editors at the time could only achieve near-real-time performance.

The client-side text editor in Etherpad and its Etherpad Lite fork is implemented using Appjet's in-browser text editor, written in JavaScript.

== History ==
=== Launch ===
Etherpad was launched on November 19, 2008, by David Greenspan, Aaron Iba, and J.D. Zamfirescu (the latter two being former Google employees). They were later joined by former Googler Daniel Clemens and designer David Cole. The original website was etherpad.com.

Etherpad was covered by Slashdot on November 21, 2008, resulting in server slowdown and downtime. This led the developers to temporarily revert the tool to closed beta, not allowing new pads to be created (but providing full and unrestricted access to the existing ones), while the server infrastructure was being improved. After the rewrite of the software was completed, the new version went live on 29 January 2009, and on February 3, the site became again open to all.

=== Acquisition ===
When Google Wave was announced, the Etherpad team wrote on their blog comparing the two platforms and stating that the minimalist and targeted Etherpad interface could be an advantage in some use cases. Still, on 4 December 2009, Etherpad announced on its blog that it had been acquired by Google for integration into Google Wave. Existing Etherpad users would receive invites for Google Wave. On 31 March 2010, Etherpad announced that creation of new pads would be allowed until April 14 (pad creation was still allowed as of April 18, though) and existing pads could still be accessed and used until May 14. Options for download/export were available. The Etherpad service terminated on May 14.

=== Open source ===
Google released the source code for Etherpad under the Apache License version 2.0 on December 17, 2009. Subsequently, Google asked the Etherpad code maintainers to remove JSMin from its code tree due to a clause in its license stating, "The Software shall be used for Good, not Evil," which is not compatible with the open source licenses allowed on Google Code.

After the release of the software as open source, a number of people have set up Etherpad servers, as clones of the original website. Soon after, users and programmers of Etherpad, after an initial meeting, created the Etherpad Foundation to coordinate further development. Their website maintains a list of a growing number of sites that run the Etherpad software.

== Etherpad Lite ==
Etherpad Lite is an almost complete rewrite of the original Etherpad software, based on different technical foundations and written by different authors. While the original Etherpad is written in Java and Scala and has quite demanding system requirements, Etherpad Lite is written in server-side JavaScript using Node.js. The original realtime synchronization library (called Easysync) remains the same.

Etherpad Lite has some distinctive features which are not available in the original version:

- An HTTP API which allows the user to interact with the pad contents, and with user and group management
- A jQuery plugin exists which helps embedding the collaborative editor in other sites
- Clients for PHP, Python, Ruby, JavaScript, Java, Objective-C and Perl, which interface with the API.
- More than 50 plugins, among them email_notifications, invite_via_email, offline_edit, fileupload, tables or rtc for video calls based on WebRTC.

Etherpad Lite offers a number of export formats, including LaTeX, but as of June 2019, not Markdown. But there is an official addon to export in markdown. Etherpad Lite supports many natural languages. Localization is achieved collaboratively through translatewiki.net.

== See also ==
- Collaborative real-time editor
- Real-time text
- Sync.in — an application based on Etherpad
