= Text format =

Text format may refer to:

Computing

- Formatted text, text containing word processor metadata for control style
- Textual file format, a non-binary file format

Graphic design

- Typesetting, the style of text on a page
- Typography, the style of text characters
  - Calligraphy, the style of hand-rendered text characters
