= MoonEdit =

2003 text editor

- Original author: Tom Dobrowolski
- Release: 2003; 23 years ago (as Multi-Editoro)
- Stable release: 1.14.1s / January 28, 2005; 21 years ago
- Written in: C
- Operating system: Linux, Windows and FreeBSD
- Available in: English, Polish
- Type: Collaborative real-time editor
- Website: moonedit.com at the Wayback Machine (archived 27 November 2016)

MoonEdit is a collaborative real-time text editor for Linux, Windows and FreeBSD. Though now discontinued, at the time of its initial release, MoonEdit was one of the only software products to fully implement real-time collaborative editing for a mass market.

MoonEdit incorporates code from Ken Silverman's BUILD game engine, and employs client-side prediction to reduce the effect of latency. Up to 14 participants can edit simultaneously, each having independent cursor positions updated in real time. Text added by each participant is highlighted a different color. Users may connect to a public server or set up their own dedicated server. MoonEdit servers listen on port 32123 by default. MoonEdit features infinite undo history that can be browsed using a time-slider and replay button.

MoonEdit was originally written by Tom Dobrowolski under the name Multi-Editoro, while he was a student at Gdańsk University of Technology, in 2003. It could be downloaded for free for non-commercial use, but an announced commercial “PRO” version never appeared. Interest may have been lost due to the appearance of several web-based real-time editing platforms, starting with Writely (now Google Docs), around 2006. While the software is no longer developed, many other text editors have adopted its feature set, including Atom (using the Teletype extension) and Visual Studio Code (using the Live Share extension).

== See also ==
- SubEthaEdit
- Gobby
- Etherpad
