= Sync.in =

- Developer: Cynapse
- Type: Collaborative real-time editor
- Website: sync.in

Sync.in was a web-based collaborative real-time editor, from Cynapse. It allowed multiple people to edit the same text document simultaneously. Participants could see others' changes in real-time, with each author's text in their own color. A chat box in the sidebar allowed participants to communicate.

Sync.in was based on EtherPad that was acquired by Google in December 2009, and released as open-source later that month.

Sync.in used the Freemium financial model. Free service required no sign-up or registration and users could create unlimited public documents. Pro version was available in a Software as a service model and offered business-centric functions.

As of May 2013, creation of public notes has been disabled on the sync.in domain.

== Features ==
Anyone can create a new collaborative text document, known as a "note". Each note has its own URL, and anyone who knows this URL can edit the note and participate in the document collaboration. Users can invite their friends or colleagues by sharing the note URL using the "share this note" functionality provided in each note. Note, URLs can be shared by Email or other social networking sites like Twitter, Facebook, Del.ici.ous, Digg, LinkedIn, Ping.fm and Cyn.in

The software auto-saves the document at each keystroke, while participants can permanently save specific versions at any time. A “time slider” feature allows anyone to explore the history of the note and how it evolved to its current state. It is a screenshot video of the creation of the note, keystroke-by-keystroke. The final document can be downloaded in HTML, plain text, or a bookmark file.

Sync.in Pro allows teams to create a secure site on a sync.in subdomain with users for everyone in the team. Notes are private to the team members, and individual notes can be password protected. There is also an option to selectively make notes available to the world.

An Adobe Air-based desktop client is available for Windows, Mac OS X and Linux and has enhanced features for Pro users. The desktop client lets users create new notes and launch notes directly from their desktop.

== See also ==
- Etherpad
- Collaborative real-time editor
- List of collaborative software — Non-real-time collaborative software
