= Native app =

Native app may refer to:

- Application software#By platform, application software that runs in the environment of a computer's operating system
- Desktop application, application software designed to run on a desktop or laptop computer
- Local-first software, software designed to store data primarily on a user's device while supporting synchronization
- Mobile app#Types, a mobile application developed for a particular mobile operating system or device platform
- Native (computing), software or systems that operate directly in a particular computing environment

== See also ==
- Cross-platform software
- Progressive web app
- Web application
