= CKEditor =

WYSIWYG rich text editor

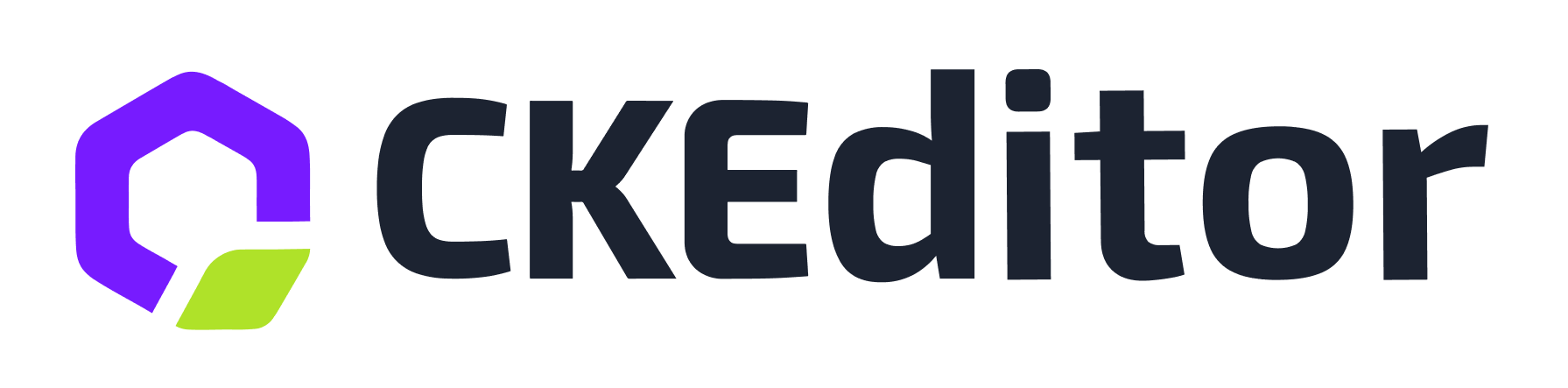
- Original author: Frederico Caldeira Knabben
- Developer: CKSource

Stable release(s)
- CKEditor 4: 4.22.1 / June 30, 2023; 3 years ago
- CKEditor 4 LTS: 4.25.1-lts / February 5, 2025; 16 months ago
- CKEditor 5: 48.0.0 / March 31, 2026; 3 months ago
- Written in: JavaScript
- Type: HTML editor, online rich-text editor
- License: CKEditor 4: GPL, LGPL and MPL; CKEditor 4 LTS: commercial CKEditor 5: GPL and commercial
- Website: ckeditor.com
- Repository: CKEditor 4 GitHub repo CKEditor 5 GitHub repo

CKEditor (formerly known as FCKeditor) is a WYSIWYG rich text editor which enables writing content directly inside of web pages or online applications. Its core code is written in TypeScript. CKEditor is available under open source and commercial licenses (including a free tier ready for commercial use).

== History ==
=== FCKeditor and CKEditor 3 ===
The first version of CKEditor, under the name FCKeditor, was released in March 2003 by Frederico Caldeira Knabben, the creator of the editor and the project's Benevolent Dictator for Life. After reaching more than 3 million downloads, FCKeditor was extensively reviewed and redesigned as CKEditor 3, with special attention given to performance, accessibility and a new UI.

=== CKEditor 4 ===
In December 2012, CKEditor 4 was released with an Inline Editing solution, reformatted source code, enhanced DOM and CSS performance. The server-side implementations were removed. It was retired in June 2023.

=== CKEditor 4 LTS ===
A special commercial-only continuance of CKEditor 4 only for security updates and critical bug fixes, limited until December 2029.

=== CKEditor 5 ===
After five years, in 2018, CKEditor 5’s first stable version was introduced. With its code rewritten from scratch, CKEditor 5 has a custom data model and plug-in-based architecture. The editor implements Operational Transformation for the tree-structured model as well as many other mechanisms which were required to create a real-time collaborative UX.

CKEditor 5 is a JavaScript framework offering a rich API for developing any type of editing solution. CKEditor 5 also offers builds, which are ready-to-use editors; there are currently 5 builds available to download: Classic, Inline, Balloon, Balloon block and Document.

=== CKEditor AI ===
In 2025 the company has released CKEditor AI - a set of drop-in components enabling AI-assisted ideation and writing inside CKEditor. It also offers APIs and server-side services that enable AI-assisted rich text operations inside complex content workflows that happen beyond CKEditor.

== Features ==
CKEditor 5 has features found in desktop word processors such as styles formatting (bold, italic, underline, bulleted and numbered lists), tables, block quoting, web resource linking, safe undo function, image inserting, paste from Word and other common HTML formatting tools. Also CKEditor 4 has built-in spell checker functionality provided as plug-ins by WebSpellChecker LLC.

There are currently many officially maintained plugins available with CKEditor to serve different needs, e.g. CKBox(digital asset management and media file delivery) (digital asset management and media file delivery) and Accessibility Checker.

All CKEditor features are available in the SaaS model (cloud) and can also be used on-premises.

=== Real-time and asynchronous collaborative editing ===
CKEditor 5's architecture and custom data model makes it possible to enable real-time collaborative editing.

A custom collaborative solution can be built by using the CKEditor components and real-time collaborative editing can be enabled by connecting to the CKEditor Cloud Services (both cloud and on-premises).

=== AI-assisted writing ===
CKEditor AI brings artificial intelligence directly into CKEditor with fully integrated UI and features that help users brainstorm, rewrite, polish, and revise content without context switching.

AI-generated rewrites, grammar corrections, and content feedback are presented as reviewable suggestions, allowing users to accept or reject individual changes before they are applied to the document.

The integration operates both within the editor interface and on the server-side, eliminating the need to transfer content between the editor and external AI tools during the editing process. Rich text formatting — including headings, tables, lists, and inline styles — is preserved when AI-assisted modifications are applied, avoiding the manual reformatting typically required when content is processed through standalone AI applications.

The feature set includes a chat interface, quick-action commands, and translation workflows, supporting different authoring tasks and working preferences within a single environment. CKEditor AI can also enable AI-assisted content modification on the backend, which enables it to be integrated inside content workflows programmatically without using the user-facing editor features.

CKEditor AI supports all the latest LLM models from the popular providers. Additionally, the on-premises distribution enables users to connect their own LLMs and use additional tools via the MCP (Model Context Protocol)

== Browser compatibility ==
CKEditor 4 is fully compatible with most web browsers, including latest stable releases of Google Chrome, Firefox, Safari, Microsoft Edge, Opera and Internet Explorer 10 and 11. In mobile environments, it has close to full support in Safari (iOS6 +) and Chrome (Android).

CKEditor 5 is also compatible with Google Chrome, Firefox, Safari, Opera and Microsoft Edge.
