= Clarence Ellis =

Clarence Ellis may refer to:

- Clarence Ellis (American football) (born 1950), American football player
- Clarence Ellis (computer scientist) (1943–2014), American computer scientist
