= Aaron Iba =

American computer programmer and entrepreneur

Aaron Iba (born June 18, 1983) is a US computer programmer and entrepreneur. He is known for co-authoring Etherpad, co-founding AppJet, and for his work as a partner in Y Combinator. Iba graduated from the Massachusetts Institute of Technology in 2005 with a degree in Mathematics.

== Background ==
Iba grew up in Lexington, Massachusetts and then attended the Massachusetts Institute of Technology. It was there that he teamed up with David Greenspan to win the annual Battlecode programming competition in 2003. Iba and Greenspan would go on to attend the Y Combinator program, where they created AppJet and Etherpad. Iba would go on to become a partner in Y Combinator, and was named "one of the best hackers among the YC alumni".

Iba is also an Angel investor in over 10 companies, including Meteor, PlanGrid, and Light Table.

== AppJet/Etherpad ==
In 2007, Iba co-founded AppJet, a company providing JavaScript development and hosting tools. AppJet received funding from notable investors including Paul Graham, Paul Buchheit, Trevor Blackwell, Mitch Kapor and Scott Banister.

AppJet failed to gain traction with developers, but in 2009 the company used its own tools to launch Etherpad, the first web-based realtime collaborative text editor.

In 2009, AppJet was acquired by Google for an undisclosed sum. The Etherpad technology and team were merged into the Google wave project.

== Y Combinator ==
In 2011, Iba became one of 6 full-time partners in Y Combinator, where he oversaw and participated in numerous investments in startup companies. In 2013, Iba left Y Combinator to found PayGarden, an alternative payments company borne out of insights he gleaned as an investor in various online merchants.
