= Clarence Ellis (computer scientist) =

American computer scientist and professor

Clarence "Skip" Ellis
- Born: Clarence Arthur Ellis; 11 May 1943; Chicago, Illinois, US
- Died: 17 May 2014; Denver, Colorado, US
- Education: Beloit College (B.S., 1964); University of Illinois at Urbana-Champaign (Ph.D., 1969)
- Scientific career
- Fields: Computer Science, Groupware, Computer-supported cooperative work, Workflow
- Workplaces: Ashesi University College; University of Colorado, Boulder; University of Texas, Austin; Xerox PARC; Stanford University; Massachusetts Institute of Technology; Microelectronics and Computer Technology Corporation
- Thesis: Probabilistic Languages and Automata (1969)
- Doctoral advisor: David E. Muller

Clarence "Skip" Ellis (May 11, 1943 – May 17, 2014) was an American computer scientist, and Emeritus Professor of Computer Science and Cognitive Science at the University of Colorado at Boulder. While at the CU-Boulder, he was the director of the Collaboration Technology Research Group and a member of the Institute of Cognitive Science. Ellis was the first Black Person to earn a Ph.D. in Computer Science (1969), and the first Black Person to be elected a Fellow of the ACM (1997). Ellis was a pioneer in Computer Supported Cooperative Work and Groupware. He and his team at Xerox PARC created OfficeTalk, one of the first groupware systems. Ellis also pioneered operational transformation, which is a set of techniques that enables real-time collaborative editing of documents.

== Childhood ==
In 1958, at age 15, Ellis applied for a job as a graveyard shift computer operator at the manufacturing firm Dover to earn money to help his family. He was offered the job because he was the only applicant. Although his job title was computer operator, his main duties were to walk around all night and be visible to prevent break-ins, and to watch over, but not touch, the company's new computer. At the time, Dover's computer was based on vacuum tube technology (2,400 vacuum tubes), used punch cards as input and output, and filled a huge room.

In Ellis' free time on the job, he read and re-read the dozens of computer manuals that came with the machine. He taught himself as much as possible about the machine without touching it. Two months after he started the job, Ellis helped the company through an emergency. They had run out of unused punch cards, and needed to use the computer to process payroll by morning. During the emergency, Ellis was the only one who knew how to recycle the used punch cards. He lifted the hood of the computer and disabled the parity check circuitry. The used punch cards were recycled and the company was able to process the payroll. After this experience, the company began to seek him out whenever they had computer problems, and even asked him to operate and program the computer for them. Ellis states that this experience helped ignite his passion for computing.

== High school and college ==
Throughout high school, Ellis' teachers recommended that he attend summer school programs at the local universities in Chicago. This was his first encounter with college-level students and university life. Though poor, Ellis was able to attend Beloit College in the fall of 1960 because the church he and his family attended awarded him a scholarship. In Ellis' junior year, Beloit College received an IBM 1620 as a donation, and he and his chemistry professor were asked to set it up. This was the start of the Beloit College computer lab, of which Ellis was the director. During the early 1960s, Beloit didn't offer a degree in computer science, however, Ellis was able to substitute some of his science laboratory work with computer projects. In 1964, Ellis received a B.S. degree from Beloit double majoring in math and physics.

After graduating from Beloit, Ellis enrolled in MIT for graduate school, but only stayed a short time because of his civil rights activism. He eventually attended graduate school at the University of Illinois at Urbana-Champaign, where he worked on hardware, software, and applications of the ILLIAC IV supercomputer. In 1969, Clarence Ellis earned a Ph.D. in computer science from UIUC, becoming the first African-American to do so. His Ph.D. advisor was David E. Muller.

== Career ==
Ellis worked at Bell Labs from 1969 to 1972 on probability theory applied to the theory of computing. In 1972 he became an assistant professor and a founding member of the computer science department at the University of Colorado Boulder to work on operating systems research.

Ellis accepted a position three years later as an assistant professor in EECS at MIT to work on research related to ARPANET. He left MIT after one year to start work at Xerox PARC and Stanford University. Ellis remained at Xerox PARC and Stanford University for nearly a decade. During his time there, he worked on the icon-based GUI, object-oriented programming languages, and groupware systems. "He was part of the team of sociologists, psychologists and computer scientists who worked on Alto, the world's first personal computer (PC) and its related interfaces and software. Many of these innovations from the 1970s that Ellis was part of were later widely commercialized, for example in Apple's Lisa computer and Microsoft's MS-DOS software. At PARC, Ellis headed the Office Research Group, which developed the first office system to use icons and Ethernet for collaborating at a distance."

In the mid-1980s, Ellis led the Groupware Research Group at the Microelectronics and Computer Technology Corporation (MCC). While at MCC, he led efforts in Real-time Collaborative Editing, and pioneered the field of Operational transformation. In the early 1990s, Ellis left MCC to become the Chief Architect of the FlowPath workflow product of Bull S.A. in France.

In 1992, Ellis returned to the University of Colorado Boulder as full professor with tenure in the computer science department. There he continued his work on groupware, in particular next-generation, large-scale Workflow systems, and agent-mediated meeting support systems. In 2009, he became an emeritus professor at the university, where he insisted on periodically teaching an introductory computing course to "encourage students of all ethnicities to expand their horizons." To provide further opportunities for students to pursue science and engineering, Ellis "helped establish the 10-week Summer Multicultural Access to Research Training (SMART) program at the university."

In 2013, Ellis won a Fulbright Scholarship to teach and perform research in the computer science department at Ashesi University. At Ashesi, his research interests were developing computer systems to simulate alternative forms of government for developing countries.

== Death ==
Ellis dedicated much of his work in later years to Ashesi University in Accra, Ghana. He died unexpectedly at the age of 71 of a pulmonary embolism during a flight home from Ghana on May 17, 2014.

== Selected publications ==
- Ellis C., Wainer J., Barthelmess P. (2003) Agent-Augmented Meetings. In: Ye Y., Churchill E. (eds) Agent Supported Cooperative Work. Multiagent Systems, Artificial Societies, and Simulated Organizations, vol 8. Springer, Boston, MA. https://doi.org/10.1007/978-1-4419-9200-0_2
- Ellis, Clarence A. and Najah Naffah. 2012. Design of Office Information Systems (1st. ed.). Springer Publishing Company, Incorporated.
- Ellis, Clarence A., Simon J. Gibbs, Gail Rein. "Groupware: some issues and experiences". Communications of the ACM. 34 (1) January 1991.
- Rein, G.L. and C.A. Ellis. "rIBIS: a real-time group hypertext system" in Computer-supported cooperative work and groupware. ed. Saul Greenberg. January 1991. Pages 223–242.
- Simmons, Chris, Charles Ellis, Sajjan Shiva, Dipankar Dasgupta, and Qishi Wu. "AVOIDIT: A cyber attack taxonomy." 9th Annual Symposium on Information Assurance (ASIA'14). 2014. 2–12.
