= Quarto (software) =

Technical publishing system

- Developer: Posit PBC
- Release: July 2022; 4 years ago
- Operating system: Cross-platform
- Platform: x86-64, ARM64
- Type: Electronic publishing, Literate programming
- License: GNU General Public License
- Website: quarto.org
- Repository: github.com/quarto-dev/quarto-cli

Quarto is a free and open-source scientific and technical publishing system developed by Posit PBC (formerly RStudio). It is a command-line tool built on Pandoc that converts plain text documents mixed with executable code including Python, R, Julia, and Observable JavaScript into static formats including PDF, HTML, MS Word, PowerPoint, ePub, RevealJS, and MediaWiki.

Quarto is considered the successor to R Markdown, extending support beyond the R ecosystem to support a broader range of data science languages and environments.

== History ==
Quarto was officially announced in July 2022 at the `rstudio::conf(2022)` conference. The release coincided with the corporate rebranding of the developer from RStudio to Posit. This rebranding and the launch of Quarto reflected a strategic shift to support language-agnostic data science workflows, specifically acknowledging the growing adoption of Python alongside R in scientific research.

In April 2026, Posit announced that it was developing Quarto 2, a rewrite of Quarto in Rust, and said it did not expect a public release for at least six months (see § Quarto 2).

== Design and implementation ==
Quarto is implemented as a Command Line Interface (CLI), which allows it to function independently of any specific Integrated Development Environment (IDE). However, extensions are available for IDEs such as RStudio, Visual Studio Code, and Jupyter.

=== File formats ===
The native source format for Quarto uses the `.qmd` extension. These files are plain text files that combine Markdown with executable code blocks. Quarto can also render existing Jupyter Notebooks (`.ipynb`) into publication-quality documents without converting them to Markdown first.

== Functionality ==
Quarto is designed to support reproducible research workflows. By integrating narrative and code into a single source file, the software is intended to ensure that analysis and reporting remain consistent.

Examples of uses of Quarto:

- Scientific Publishing: Native support for academic citations, bibliographies, and cross-referencing of figures, tables, and equations.
- Multi-format Output: A single source file can be rendered into dozens of formats, including HTML websites, PDF (via LaTeX or Typst), EPUB, and presentations (e.g., Reveal.js, Microsoft PowerPoint).

== Quarto 2 ==
Quarto 2 is a rewrite of Quarto in Rust, developed openly on GitHub under the name q2. Posit announced it in April 2026 as "a full rewrite of Quarto in Rust", released like Quarto 1 under the MIT License. Posit stated that it aims for Quarto 2 to be backward compatible with Quarto 1, while expecting gaps in early versions, and that Quarto 1 would continue to be developed and maintained in parallel until Quarto 2 can replace it.

The main changes described by Posit are a new parser for Quarto's Markdown dialect and a built-in collaborative editor. The parser is based on a formal Tree-sitter grammar. Unlike CommonMark, which treats any input as valid, it reports syntax errors with error codes and source locations, and it keeps fine-grained source maps that link output back to the source text. The collaborative editor is built on the Automerge library and is designed to work both in a web browser and from the command line. The development version also includes a Model Context Protocol server that lets AI agents read and edit documents in collaborative projects, and produces PDF output through Typst. LaTeX output was not yet implemented.

As of November 2026, q2 was distributed as experimental pre-release builds, which its repository described as "not yet ready for production use".

== See also ==
- Pandoc
- RStudio
- Jupyter
- Literate programming
