= Typst =

Open-source typesetting system

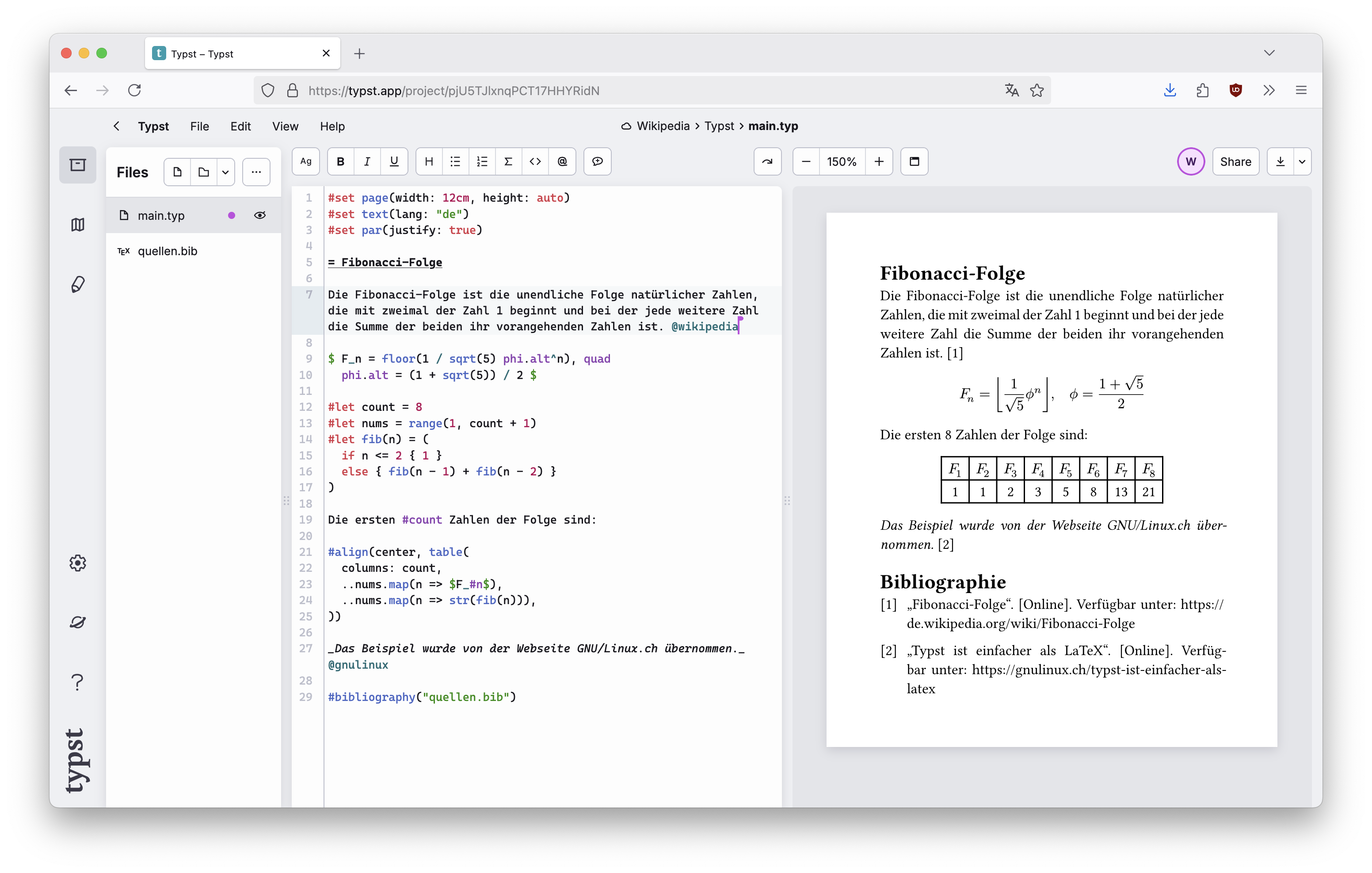
- Original authors: Martin Haug, Laurenz Mädje
- Developer: Typst GmbH
- Release: March 21, 2023; 3 years ago
- Stable release: 0.15.1 / 17 July 2026
- Written in: Rust
- Platform: Cross-platform
- Type: Typesetting
- License: Apache-2.0
- Website: typst.app
- Repository: github.com/typst

Typst (/ˈtaɪpst/) is an open-source typesetting system and corresponding markup language. The Typst compiler is free software and is distributed under the Apache License 2.0 license.

The system is designed for writing and formatting scientific texts and mathematical formulas. Typst supports simple formatting for common formatting applications, customizable functions, an integrated scripting language, and mathematical typesetting. It is designed to be an alternative to LaTeX.

The compiler is developed by Typst GmbH, which maintains and supports the software's development, and operates a proprietary collaborative cloud-based editor, offering both free and paid services in a manner similar to Overleaf, which allows users to preview their work while writing and includes a collaboration feature.

Typst
- Filename extension: .typ
- Internet media type: text/vnd.typst
- Developed by: Typst GmbH
- Type of format: Typesetting
- Open format?: Yes
- Free format?: Yes
- Website: typst.app/docs/reference/syntax/

== History ==
Typst has been developed since 2019 and was first published in 2022 by Laurenz Mädje and Martin Haug for their master's theses at Technische Universität Berlin. In March 2023, the Typst compiler was released as open-source, and the beta version of its web app was simultaneously announced. As of 2025, the web app is out of beta.

According to GitHub, Typst was the second fastest-growing programming language by percentage in 2025.

== Typesetting system ==
Typst is a markup language, similar to Markdown, "designed to be as powerful as LaTeX while being much easier to learn and use." Its compiler is incremental and function calls are memoized for quick update of the document preview.

Typst has three modes, for markup, math, and code. By default, the user is in markup mode, which is used primarily for prose. Math mode is applied to text enclosed between dollar signs ($) and is designed for writing mathematical formulas. Typst's native scripting language is executed in code mode and marked with a hash symbol (#) in front of the command or block. Markup mode uses dedicated syntax for common formatting elements such as headings (=), emphasis (__), strong emphasis (**), and lists (+, -, /), while markup lacking dedicated syntax can be accessed by calling functions through code mode.

Unlike LaTeX, there are no minimum requirements for the structure of a document. A preamble is not needed, and document properties need not be set if not modified from their defaults. Furthermore, many features which need external packages in LaTeX (such as bibliography support) are implemented natively in Typst. Typst supports community-provided packages and templates; however compared with LaTeX, Typst has relatively fewer specialized packages available.

As of April 2026, International Journal of Interactive Multimedia and Artificial Intelligence and Jurnal Ilmiah Teknologi Informasi are the only journals that accept manuscripts written in Typst.

== Compatibility and converters ==
Typst has native document export for PDF, PNG and SVG formats, with PDF/A and PDF/UA-1 output available.

Typst documents are written in plain text and compiled to produce output files (such as PDFs). A language server has been developed for Typst that can be installed for supported text editors (such as VS Code and Neovim) providing live previews, error information, and enabling users to compile documents directly within the editor, akin to the official web interface. Typst has also been integrated into other software, notably Quarto, and is supported as an input and output format in Pandoc.

Zerodha adopted Typst for generating transactions records citing its ease of use and performance, transitioning from LuaLaTeX. Scientists working on SciPy conference proceedings adopted Typst for PDF generation.

== Example ==
The example below shows the input to Typst and the corresponding output from the system:

Input (Source code)

#set page(paper: "a4")
#set text(lang: "en")
#set par(justify: true)
// Comments are introduced by a double slash

= Fibonacci Sequence
// '=' starts a heading

In mathematics, the Fibonacci sequence is a sequence in which each element is the sum of the two elements that precede it.
@wikipedia-fibonacci // '@' references figures, sections or sources found in the bibliography

The Fibonacci sequence is defined through the recurrence relation $F_n = F_(n-1) + F_(n-2)$. It can also be expressed in _closed form:_ // '_' emphasizes the enclosed text

$
  F_n = lr(floor.l 1 / sqrt(5) phi.alt^n ceil.r), quad phi.alt = (1 + sqrt(5)) / 2
$
//'$' parses the enclosed text as math formulas

#let count = 14
#let nums = range(1, count + 1)
#let fib(n) = (
  if n <= 2 { 1 }
  else { fib(n - 1) + fib(n - 2) }
)
// '#' switches to 'code mode' and 'let' defines variables such as 'count' and functions such as 'fib(n)'

The first #count numbers of the infinite sequence are:

#align(center,
  table(
    columns: count,
    ..nums.map(n => $F_#n$),
    ..nums.map(n => str(fib(n))),
  )
)

#bibliography(bytes(```yaml
wikipedia-fibonacci:
  type: article
  title: Fibonacci Sequence
  url:
    value: https://en.wikipedia.org/wiki/Fibonacci_sequence
    date: 2026-02-16
```.text))
// A bibliography may also be created from Hayagriva (a YAML-based format developed for Typst) or BibLaTeX files on disk

// Code mode can further be used to embed variables in content, create graphics such as tables, embed information from other files, or set rules

Output
