= TinyMCE =

Online rich-text editor

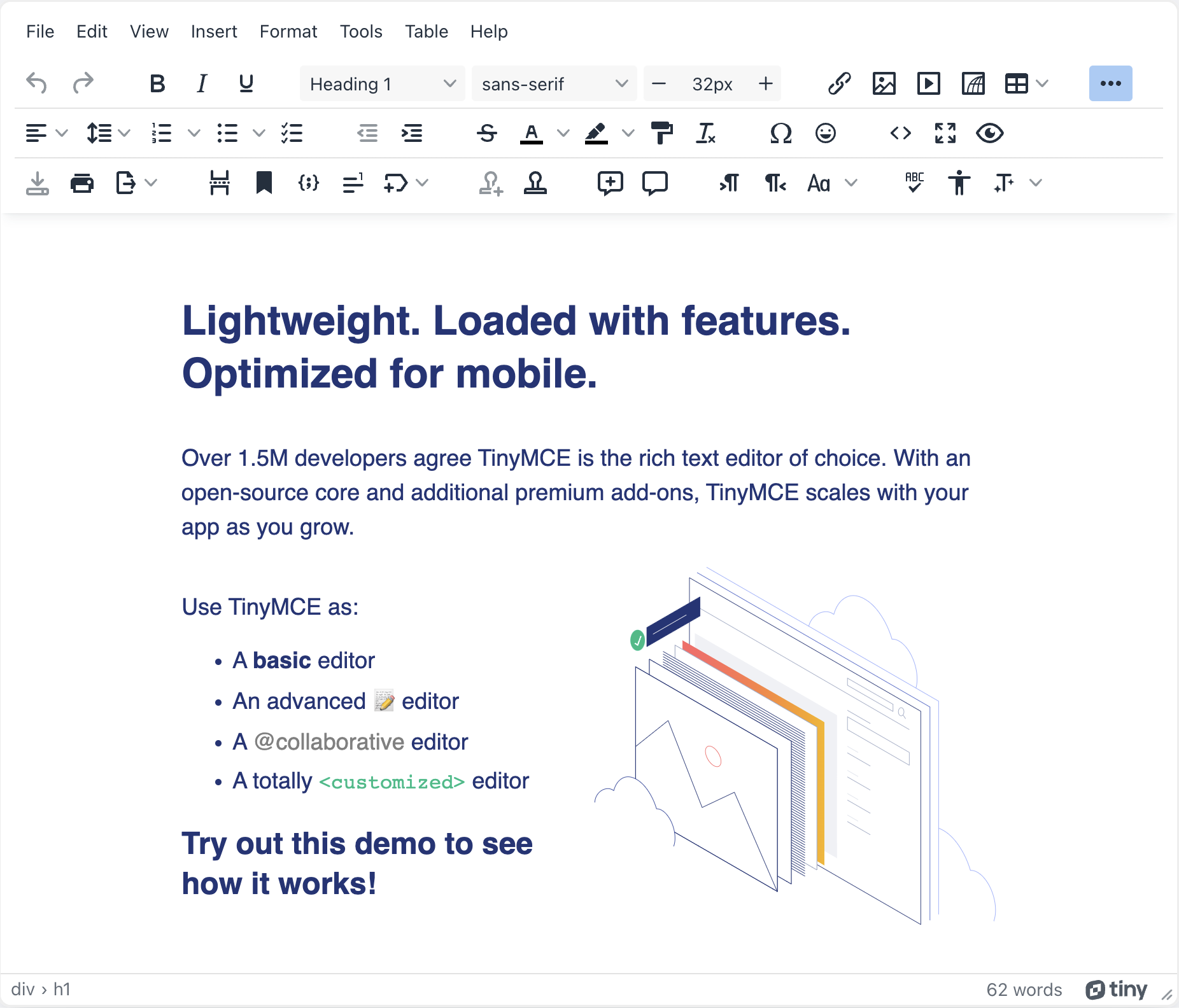
- TinyMCE running with the default skin
- Developer: Tiny Technologies Inc.
- Release: 1.0 / 11 March 2004; 22 years ago
- Stable release: 8.2 / October 23, 2025; 10 months ago
- Written in: TypeScript
- Operating system: Cross-platform
- Type: HTML editor
- License: GPL-2.0-or-later and commercial (Note: GPL-2.0-only since 2024-03-20. Some advanced features are under commercial licenses.)
- Website: www.tiny.cloud
- Repository: github.com/tinymce/tinymce

TinyMCE is an online rich-text editor released as open-source software under the GNU General Public License version 2 or later. TinyMCE uses a freemium business model that includes a free core editor and paid plans with advanced features. It converts HTML textarea fields, or other designated HTML elements, into editor instances.

TinyMCE is designed to integrate with JavaScript libraries such as React, Vue.js, Angular, and Stencil.js, as well as content management systems such as Joomla! and WordPress.

== Browser compatibility ==
TinyMCE is compatible with the following browsers

- Google Chrome
- Mozilla Firefox
- Safari
- Microsoft Edge

It is compatible with these browsers on any operating system that officially supports them.

As of version 6.0, released 2022-03-03, support for Internet Explorer was dropped.

== API ==
TinyMCE includes an extensive API for custom integration.

== Plugins ==
TinyMCE uses plugins extensively.

=== Free and open source plugins ===
TinyMCE 7 shipped with 28 open source plugins including:

- List Styles
- Character Map
- Code
- Code Sample
- Directionality
- Preview
- Save
- Search and Replace
- Table
- Visual Blocks

=== Proprietary plugins ===
There are 30 proprietary plugins, only available from Tiny with a paid subscription for TinyMCE 7 including:

- Accessibility Checker
- AI Assistant
- Enhanced Code Editor
- Enhanced Tables
- Export to PDF
- Export to Word
- Import from Word
- Link Checker
- Math Equations
- Markdown
- PowerPaste
- Revision History
- Spell Checker
- Templates

== File management ==
TinyMCE is primarily a client-side application. It, consequently, does not include native file managers for various server technologies.

Multiple file manager solutions have been produced, including several open source file manager solutions, and at least two proprietary projects, developed by Tiny Technologies and EdSDK.

None of the open source file managers are still being developed or maintained and they are all incompatible with currently supported versions of TinyMCE.

=== Free and open source file managers ===
Open source file managers for use with TinyMCE
Project	Description	Compatibility	Notes
Open Manager	An Ajax file uploader and image gallery plugin	TinyMCE 3.x	The original developer closed this project some years ago and does not recommend it be used in production. No others have forked and updated the code-base.
TinyBrowser	File manager featuring multiple file upload support.	TinyMCE 3.x	The uploader requires the, now deprecated, Adobe Flash. Also, this project has not been updated since 2011.
TinyCIMM	TinyMCE CodeIgniter Media Manager: a plugin for both TinyMCE and CodeIgniter, which allows image and media file management from within TinyMCE.	TinyMCE 3.x	The announcement page for this project is a, now-archived, ExpressionEngine CMS forum page. Also, the demo and download page, as of 2023-02-02, returns a 404 error.
IMCE	An image and file uploader and browser for rich text editors that supports personal directories and quotas.	TinyMCE 3.x	Being actively developed as of 2023-02 but no further updates to TinyMCE support and no support for versions of TinyMCE beyond 3.x.
PDW Media Browser	A media browser with a Windows 7-style user interface.	TinyMCE 3.x	No longer being actively developed and no longer available from the original developer's site because 'it isn't safe to use anymore.'
Responsive File Manager	A file manager and image manager made with the jQuery library, CSS3, PHP and HTML5.	TinyMCE 5.x, TinyMCE 4.x, and TinyMCE 3.x	Released under a Creative Commons Attribution-NonCommercial 3.0 Unported License which requires a payment to the author for use in a commercial project or setting.

=== Proprietary file managers ===
Proprietary file managers for use with TinyMCE
Project	Description	Compatibility	Notes
Flmngr	PHP File Manager with Image Editor and Amazon S3 and Azure Blob support.	TinyMCE 6.x, TinyMCE 5.x, and TinyMCE 4.x.	Free for one website with up to 15 end-users. Requires a paid subscription or paid license for more features or more sites and users.
MoxieManager	File and image management for TinyMCE.	TinyMCE 6.x and TinyMCE 5.x.	Requires a commercial TinyMCE subscription. Only provided for self-hosted TinyMCE instances.

== Third-party TinyMCE plugins ==
Third-party TinyMCE plugins
Name	Description	Compatibility	Notes
After the deadline	A spelling, style, and grammar checking software service with a TinyMCE plugin.	TinyMCE 3.x.	After the Deadline (AtD) is no longer actively maintained and the hosted service has shut down. The source code is available to self-host an AtD server.
Bootstrap plugin for TinyMCE	Use Bootstrap components and CSS in TinyMCE	TinyMCE 5.x (using Bootstrap 4) and TinyMCE 6.x (using Bootstrap 5)	Requires a paid license for use.
CodeMirror	A code editor web component, available as (among other things) a TinyMCE plugin.	TinyMCE 4.x, TinyMCE 5.x, and TinyMCE 6.x.	Released under the open source MIT License.
N1ED	Visual editor for block-by-block content creation.	TinyMCE 4.x, TinyMCE 5.x, and TinyMCE 6.x.	Base editor is free for one site and up to five users. Requires a paid subscription for premium features, multiple sites, and more users.
PDW Toggle Toolbars	Shows and hides TinyMCE toolbars.	TinyMCE 4.x.	No specific licence. The source includes boilerplate permissions copied from the MIT Licence.
TextareaAI ChatGPT plugin	ChatGPT copywriting plugin for TinyMCE.	TinyMCE 4.x, TinyMCE 5.x, and TinyMCE 6.x.	Free for the first 2,500 words generated by a query to the ChatGPT API. Requires a paid subscription or paid license for more words and users.
TinyMCE 6.x ChatGPT Plugin	Integrates ChatGPT into TinyMCE.	TinyMCE 6.x	Released under the open source MIT License.

== Language support ==
- 65 different community-contributed language packs, including right-to-left support, are available for TinyMCE 7.
- 38 different professionally localized language packs, including right-to-left support, are provided to paid Tiny Cloud and self-hosted deployments of TinyMCE 7.

== Product support ==
Community peer-to-peer support for TinyMCE is available on platforms such as GitHub and Stack Overflow. Product support is available when purchasing any subscription with TinyMCE.

Official support for TinyMCE 5.10 (the last version 5 release) ended on 2023-04-20.

== Themes and skins ==
In TinyMCE, themes and skins refer to different aspects of the editor. A theme relates to the editor's construction, while a skin makes changes to the appearance of the editor.

In TinyMCE 5.x, the default theme is called Silver, and the default skin is called Oxide.

In TinyMCE 6.x the default theme is also called Silver, and the default skin is also called Oxide.

Skins for TinyMCE 5 or 6 can be created and customized with TinyMCE's interactive skin tool.

In Version 4 of TinyMCE, the first skin tool was created and more skins were made available in the skin/plugin repository.

TinyMCE 2.x→3.x offered various ways to customize the look and feel of the editor. TinyMCE 3.x came packaged with two themes, simple and advanced, as well as two skins for each theme, default and o2k7.

== Compressor ==
TinyMCE also has an optional compressor pack to reduce the overall script download footprint, in the time it takes the script to initialize. The compressor pack is available for PHP, ASPX, JSP, and CFML. A third-party Ruby on Rails compressor pack is also available.

== History ==
TinyMCE was spun out of a content management system developed by Johan “Spocke” Sorlin and Joakim Lindkvist from their original content management system, Moxiecode Content Editor, in 2004.

=== Release history ===
Legend:
Unsupported
Supported
Latest version
Preview version

Version	Release date	Notes
1.0	March 11, 2004	
1.1	May 26, 2004	
1.2	July 5, 2004	
1.3	September 10, 2004	
1.4	January 9, 2005	
2.0	December 1, 2005	
2.1	February 13, 2007	
3.0	January 30, 2008	
3.1	June 17, 2008	
3.2	September 11, 2008	
3.3	March 10, 2010	
3.4	March 10, 2011	
3.5	May 5, 2012	
4.0	June 16, 2013	Rewrite of UI layer and editor core APIs
4.1	June 18, 2014	HTML5 Scheme support
4.2	June 25, 2015	Flat skin. Image tools for crop, resize and filters
4.3	November 25, 2015	Table column/row resize support and inline table toolbar, notifications API, APIs for creating non-editable widgets
4.4	June 30, 2016	Medium-style theme, improved image editor
4.5	November 30, 2016	Sidebar panel and insert menu UI, enhanced anchor linking, table of contents plugin
4.6	May 4, 2017	Enhanced link editing, new help plugin, dropped support for IE 8/9/10
4.7	October 3, 2017	Enhanced modern theme, new mobile theme
4.8	July 11, 2018	
4.9	November 7, 2018	
5.0	February 4, 2019	Completely new UI layer
5.1	October 17, 2019	All default UI components now work on mobile natively
5.2	February 3, 2020	Placeholder. New toolbar options. Accessibility enhancements.
5.3	June 11, 2020	New toolbar location default settings, moved the enabled checkmark on toggle menu items
5.4	July 23, 2020	Updates and additions to the Table plugin
5.5	October 20, 2020	TinyMCE core TypeScript types are now public
5.6	December 8, 2020	New images_file_types option for customizing recognized image file extensions
5.7	February 24, 2021	Added support for table_column_resizing when inserting and deleting table columns
5.8	May 5, 2021	TinyMCE core editor update, additional changes to premium plugins, editor resize handle now controllable using the keyboard.
5.9	August 25, 2021	TinyMCE core editor update, improved table management, announces deprecation of various plugins.
5.10	October 10, 2021	TinyMCE core editor update, new API checks if a URI is safe to insert into the DOM, additional deprecation announcements.
6.0	March 3, 2022	Multiple new and changed APIs, support for Microsoft Internet Explorer 11 dropped, licence change: TinyMCE now released under the MIT License.
6.1	June 6, 2022	New event log API, new option to show a specified sidebar on editor launch, multiple added options and functions.
6.2	September 8, 2022	New option for specifying which non-editable elements can be format-wrapped, new option for adding search fields to toolbar menu buttons, new commercial plugins for footnotes, mail-merge fields, and typo autocorrection.
6.3.1	December 6, 2022	New option in the commercial Advanced Code editor plugin for opening said source-code editor in the edit window rather than a nested dialog box, two new API functions for selecting words from the insertion point location, new commercial plugins for generating inline css, and for formatting a document with so-called 'smart' typography. Also includes a fix for a cross-site scripting vulnerability, CVE-2022-23494.
6.4.0	March 16, 2023	New tree component for use in custom dialogs; new commercial Advanced Templates plugin; new API methods; new xss_sanitization option to disable XSS sanitization; and new UI objects and options.
6.5	June 13, 2023	New open source plugin, Accordion, creates expandable and collapsable document sections; updates to a dozen commercial plugins; in-application help text re-written and translated.
6.6	July 12, 2023	New commercial plugin, AI Assistant, which can query OpenAI's ChatGPT chatbot (requires an OpenAI API key); new properties for controlling dialog box presentation, appearance, and behaviour.
6.7.0	August 30, 2023	Updates to several proprietary plugins, including Accessibility Checker, Advanced Code, Advanced Templates, AI Assistant, and Table of Contents; two new commands: InsertNewBlockBefore and InsertNewBlockAfter; UI and UX improvements; and two dozen bug fixes and changes.
6.8	November 22, 2023	Enhancements to Advanced Templates, improved bundling support, several accessibility improvements, as well as 24 bug fixes.
7.0	March 20, 2024	New features that increase user-satisfaction and workflow efficiency: Markdown, Revision History, and Document Converters. License changed from MIT to GPL-2.0-only. TinyMCE 7.0 also carries 17 bug fixes.
7.1	May 8, 2024	Introduced Math Equation feature, new integrations for the AI Assistant and 22 bug fixes and minor enhancements.
7.3	August 7, 2024	Includes an accompanying release of the AI Assistant premium plugin that has Add "Translate" options .
7.4	October 9, 2024	Introduced a new context property for all ui components and a new option allow_mathml_annotation_encodings to opt-in to keep math annotations with specific encodings.
7.5	November 6, 2024	Improved color picker aria support
8.2	October 23, 2025	Improved color picker aria support
