= Gobby =

Collaborative real-time text editor

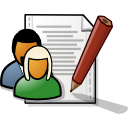

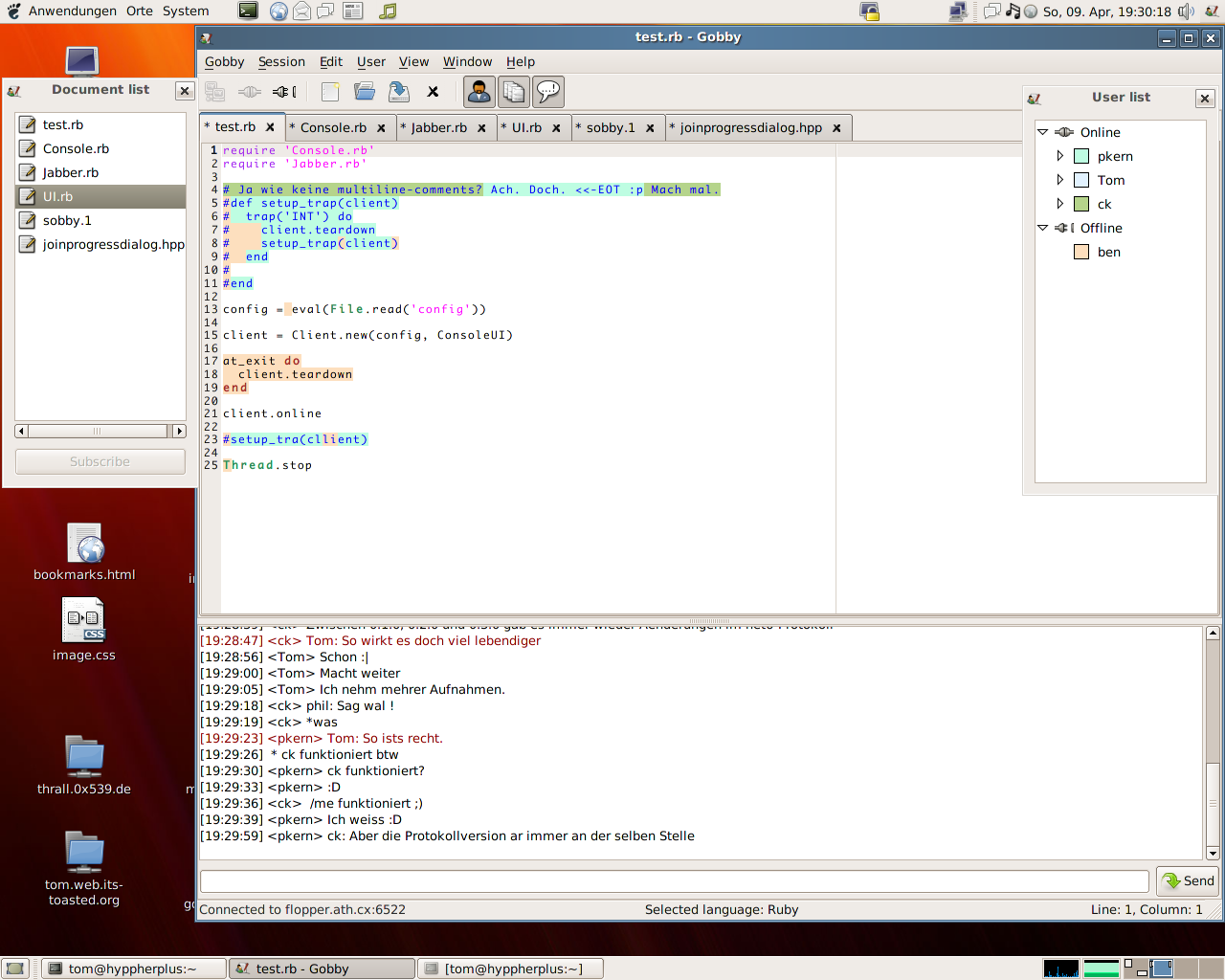
- Gobby 0.4.0
- Original author: Armin Burgmeier
- Developer: 0x539 dev group
- Stable release: 0.6.0 / January 21, 2021; 5 years ago
- Repository: github.com/gobby/gobby
- Written in: C++, C.
- Operating system: Unix, Windows
- Type: Text editor
- License: GNU GPLv2+
- Website: gobby.0x539.de

Gobby is a free software collaborative real-time editor available on Windows and Unix-like platforms. (It runs on Mac OS X using Apple's X11.app.) It was initially released in June 2005 by the 0x539 dev group (the hexadecimal value 0x539 is equal to 1337 in decimal). Gobby uses GTK+ for its GUI widgets.

== Description ==
Gobby features a client-server architecture which supports multiple documents in one session, document synchronisation on request, password protection and an IRC-like chat for communication out of band. Users can choose a colour to highlight the text they have written in a document. Gobby is fully Unicode-aware, provides syntax highlighting for most programming languages, and has basic Zeroconf support.

A dedicated server called Sobby is also provided, together with a script which could format saved sessions for the web (e.g. to provide logs of meetings with a collaboratively prepared transcript). The collaborative editing protocol is named Obby, and there are other implementations that use this protocol (e.g. Rudel, a plugin for GNU Emacs). Gobby 0.5 replaces Sobby with a new server called infinoted.

Version 0.4.0 featured fully encrypted connections and further usability enhancements. Users have commented versions prior to 0.5.0 had some issues.

Versions numbered 0.4.9x are preview releases for version 0.5.0. The most noticeable improvement is undo support, using the adOPTed algorithm for concurrency control.

== Criticisms ==
While offering Unicode support it has been suggested the product is suitable for producing plaintext rather than formatted documents.

== See also ==
- Collaborative real-time editor
