= Formatted text =

Text which includes styling information

In computing, formatted text, styled text, or rich text, as opposed to plain text, is digital text which has styling information beyond the minimum of semantic elements: colours, styles (boldface, italic), sizes, and special features in HTML (such as hyperlinks).

== Beginnings of formatted text ==
Formatted text has its genesis in the pre-computer use of underscoring to embolden passages in typewritten manuscripts.

In the first interactive systems of early computer technology, underlining was not possible, and users made up for this lack (and the lack of formatting in ASCII) by using certain symbols as substitutes. Emphasis, for example, could be achieved in ASCII in a number of ways:

- Capitalization: I am NOT making this up.
- Surrounding with underscores: I am _not_ making this up.
- Surrounding with asterisks: I am *not* making this up.
- Spacing: I am n o t making this up.

Surrounding by underscores was also used for book titles: Look it up in _The_C_Programming_Language_.

== Markup languages ==
Formatting can be marked by tags distinguished from the body text by special characters, such as angle brackets in HTML. For example, this text:

The dog is classified as Canis familiaris in taxonomy.

is marked up in HTML thus:

<p>The dog is classified as <i>Canis familiaris</i> in taxonomy.</p>

The italicised text is enclosed by an opening and a closing italics tag. In LaTeX, the text would be marked up like this:

The dog is classified as \textit{Canis familiaris} in taxonomy.

Most markup languages can be edited with any text editor, needing no special software. Many markup languages can also be edited with specialized software designed to automate some functions or present the output as WYSIWYG.

== Formatted document files ==
Since the invention of MacWrite, the first WYSIWYG word processor, in which the typist codes the formatting visually rather than by inserting textual markup, word processors have tended to save to binary files. Opening such files with a text editor reveals them embedded with various binary characters, either around the formatted text (e.g. in WordPerfect) or separate from it, at the beginning or end of the file (e.g. in Microsoft Word).

Formatted text documents in binary files have, however, the disadvantages of formatting scope and secrecy. Whereas the extent of formatting is accurately marked in markup languages, WYSIWYG formatting is based on memory, that is, keeping for example your pressing of the boldface button until cancelled. This can lead to formatting mistakes and maintenance troubles. As for secrecy, formatted text document file formats tend to be proprietary and undocumented, leading to difficulty in coding compatibility by third parties, and also to unnecessary upgrades because of version changes.

WordStar was a popular word processor that did not use binary files with hidden characters.

OpenOffice.org Writer saves files in an XML format. However, the resultant file is a binary since it is compressed (a tarball equivalent).

PDF is another formatted text file format that is usually binary (using compression for the text, and storing graphics and fonts in binary). It is generally an end-user format, written from an application such as Microsoft Word or OpenOffice.org Writer, and not editable by the user once done.

== See also ==
- Character encoding
- Online rich-text editor
- Prepress
- Word processor
