= FuseBase =

- Developer: FuseBase
- Release: 1 August 2014; 11 years ago
- Operating system: Web
- Platform: SaaS
- Type: AI Agents, Portals, Client Portals, Vendor Portals, Partner Portals, Internal Collaboration, External collaboration
- License: Freemium (paid tiers available)
- Website: thefusebase.com

FuseBase is a web-based client portal and client collaboration platform developed by Nimbus Web Inc. The software is designed for client-facing businesses and teams that manage external stakeholders, including clients, partners, vendors, prospects, and customers. FuseBase combines internal workspaces and external client portals for document collaboration, secure file sharing, onboarding, deal rooms, approvals, white-label portals, workflow automation, client-facing apps, and AI-assisted operations.

== Product ==
FuseBase provides an internal workspace for teams and external workspaces that function as client portals. Its portal features include branded client areas, client accounts, secure file sharing, task lists, live chat, forms, surveys, e-signatures, analytics, white-label support, and custom domains.

The platform is marketed to agencies, consultants, professional services firms, sales teams, customer success teams, support teams, RevOps, onboarding, implementation, and operations teams. Its current positioning emphasizes the use of client portals, client collaboration, apps, workflows, permissions, and AI-assisted operations to support client-facing work.

== History ==
The platform was founded in 2014 as Nimbus Note, the platform started as a cross-platform note-taking and information management tool. As it evolved into Nimbus Platform, it added project management and client portal capabilities. In 2023, the company rebranded as FuseBase, pivoting to connect and automate both internal and external collaboration through AI Agents and cutting-edge protocol adoption like MCP. At the same time, FuseBase was named Product of the Year on Product Hunt.

== Technical overview ==
The platform integrates the Model Context Protocol (MCP), an open-source framework created by Anthropic. MCP allows AI models to securely access and interact with external data, tools, and systems. This enables FuseBase AI Agents to gather relevant context, perform actions, and provide more advanced automation.

== See also ==
- Model Context Protocol (MCP)
- Collaboration software
- Client portal
- Digital workplace
