= Automerge =

Software library for collaborative applications

- Original authors: Martin Kleppmann, Orion Henry, Peter van Hardenberg, Roshan Choxi, Adam Wiggins
- Developers: Ink & Switch and contributors
- Release: 2017; 9 years ago
- Stable release: 3.5.0 / September 16, 2026; 53 days ago
- Written in: Rust (since 2.0); JavaScript (earlier versions)
- Type: Conflict-free replicated data type library
- License: MIT License
- Website: automerge.org
- Repository: github.com/automerge/automerge

Automerge is a free and open-source software library for building collaborative applications. It implements a conflict-free replicated data type (CRDT) for JSON-like documents: copies of a document can be edited concurrently on different devices and later merged automatically, without a central server.

== History ==
Automerge was created in 2017 by Martin Kleppmann, Orion Henry, Peter van Hardenberg, Roshan Choxi and Adam Wiggins, with copyright held by the research lab Ink & Switch and the University of Cambridge. It is based on research by Kleppmann and Alastair Beresford on a JSON CRDT, although the algorithm differs from the one in their paper in its details. Automerge was one of the technologies discussed in the 2019 paper "Local-first software" by Kleppmann, Wiggins, van Hardenberg and Mark McGranaghan. The paper proposed software that keeps the primary copy of data on users' own devices, with CRDTs as a basis for collaboration.

Version 2.0, released in January 2023, was a ground-up rewrite with a core written in Rust, which is used from JavaScript through WebAssembly and from other languages through a C interface. The project reported that it was considerably faster and used less memory than version 1. Version 3.0, released in July 2025, reduced memory usage by more than a factor of ten while keeping the same file format.

== Design ==
An Automerge document can contain nested maps and lists, text and numeric counters. The library keeps the full history of changes to a document, and stores documents in a compressed columnar format. A sync protocol exchanges changes between copies of a document independently of the network transport, so documents can be synchronised peer-to-peer, through a server, or as files. Besides Rust and JavaScript, ports or bindings exist for languages including Swift, Python, C and Java.

The collaborative editor of Quarto 2 is built on Automerge.
