= SubEthaEdit =

- Original authors: Ulrich Bauer, Martin Ott, Martin Pittenauer, Dominik Wagner
- Developer: SubEthaEdit Contributors
- Stable release: 5.2.4 / 8 January 2022; 4 years ago
- Written in: Objective-C
- Operating system: macOS
- Type: Digital distribution / Text editor
- License: MIT
- Website: subethaedit.net
- Repository: github.com/subethaedit/SubEthaEdit

SubEthaEdit is a collaborative real-time editor designed for macOS. The name comes from the Sub-Etha communication network in The Hitchhiker's Guide to the Galaxy series.

== History ==
SubEthaEdit was first released under the name Hydra in early 2003 but, for legal reasons, the name was changed to SubEthaEdit in late 2004.

The first version of Hydra was built in just a few months with the intent of winning an Apple Design Award, which it did at Apple's Worldwide Developers Conference 2003. In 2007, TheCodingMonkeys licensed the "Subetha Engine" to Panic for use in Coda.

In June 2014, SubEthaEdit 4 was released, distributed exclusively in the Mac App Store. With version 5 released in 2019, the application became free and open source, under the MIT license.

== Features ==
Apart from the usual text-editing capabilities, collaborative editing is one of SubEthaEdit's key features. The collaboration is document-based, non-locking, and non-blocking. Anyone participating in the collaborative edit can type in the document anywhere at any time. Using Bonjour (formerly Rendezvous) and BEEP, SubEthaEdit works without any configuration on the LAN but can also coordinate collaborative editing over the Internet. SubEthaEdit can be used for distributed pair programming and collaborative note-taking in conferences.

Other SubEthaEdit features include:

- Regular expression search and replace in many regexp dialects
- Customizable syntax highlighting and symbol pop-up for more than twenty languages — and over 40 user contributed languages.
- Full line-ending and character encoding support (including Unicode)
- Live-updating preview of rendered HTML documents using WebKit

== See also ==
- MoonEdit
- Etherpad
