= Samer Hassan =

Spanish/Lebanese computer scientist (born 1982)

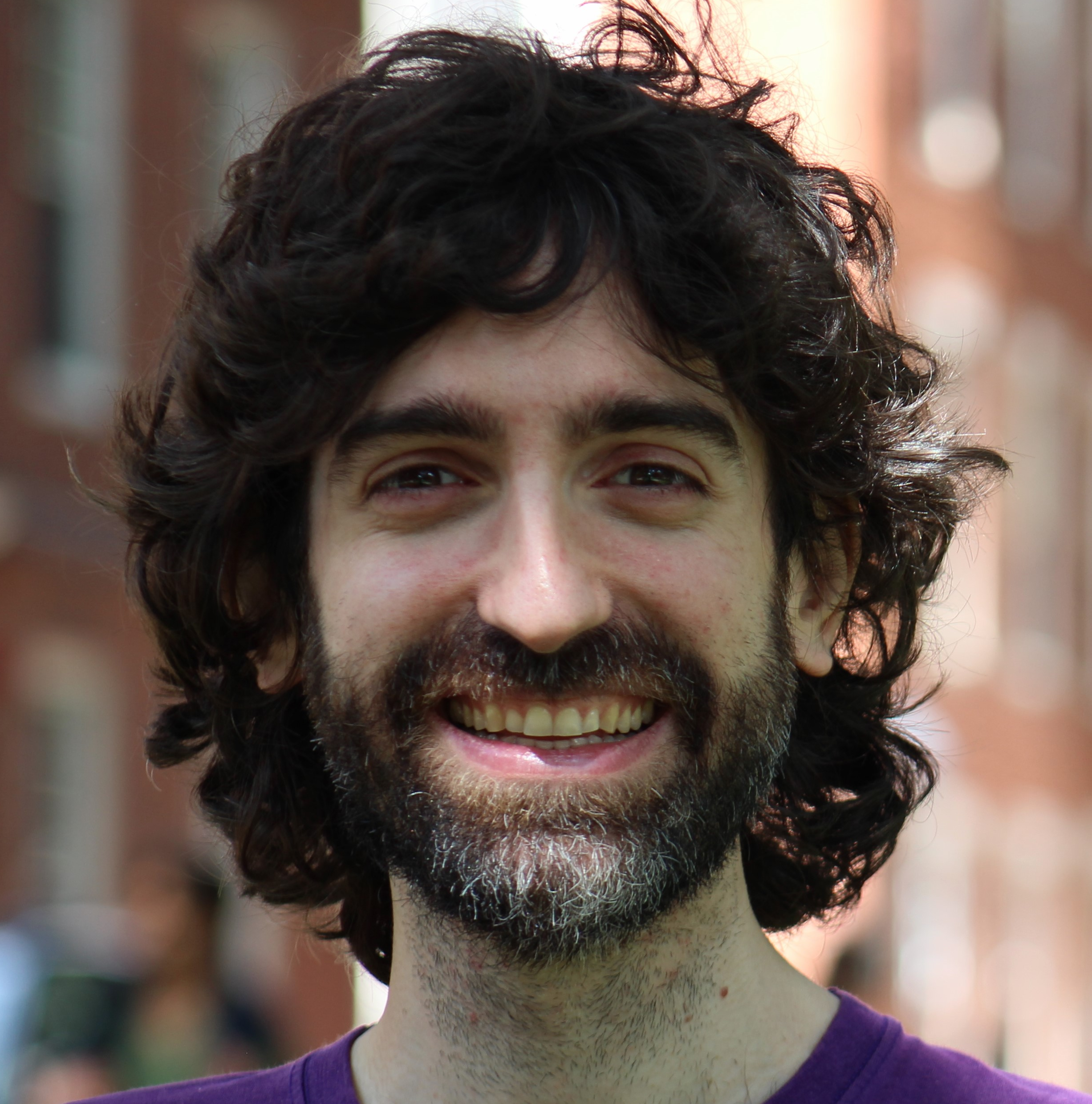
- Born: Samer Hassan Collado; 1982 (age 43–44); Madrid, Spain
- Other name: Samer Hassan Collado
- Education: Universidad Complutense de Madrid, University of Surrey
- Awards: ERC Grant
- Scientific career
- Fields: Blockchain, Commons, Peer-to-peer, Agent-based modelling, Social simulation
- Workplaces: Universidad Complutense de Madrid, Berkman Klein Center for Internet & Society (Harvard University)
- Thesis: Towards a Data-driven Approach for Agent-Based Modelling: Simulating Spanish Postmodernisation (2010)
- Doctoral advisor: Juan Pavón, Millán Arroyo Mendéndez
- Website: https://samer.hassan.name

Samer Hassan is a computer scientist, social scientist, activist and researcher, focused on the study of the collaborative economy, online communities and decentralized technologies. He is an associate professor at Universidad Complutense de Madrid (Spain) and Faculty Associate at the Berkman Klein Center for Internet & Society at Harvard University. He is the recipient of an ERC Grant of 1.5M€ with the P2P Models project, to research blockchain-based decentralized autonomous organizations for the collaborative economy.

== Education and career ==
Hassan is a Spanish/Lebanese scholar with an interdisciplinary background, which combines computer sciences with social sciences and activism. He received a degree in Computer Science and MSc in Artificial Intelligence from the Universidad Complutense de Madrid (UCM) in Spain. He also studied three years of Political Science at the distance learning university UNED. He then pursued a PhD in Social Simulation at the department of Software Engineering and Artificial Intelligence of UCM, supervised by the computer scientist Juan Pavón and the sociologist Millán Arroyo-Menéndez.

He has been researching in several institutions, funded by several scholarships and awards, most notably Harvard's Real Colegio Complutense, and the Spanish postdoctoral grants Juan de la Cierva and José Castillejo. Thus, he was a visiting researcher at the Centre for Research in Social Simulation, in the Department of Sociology at the University of Surrey in the UK, working under the supervision of Nigel Gilbert (2007-2008), and a lecturer at the American University of Science and Technology in Lebanon (2010–11). He was selected as Fellow at the Berkman Klein Center for Internet & Society at Harvard University (2015-2017) and is presently a Faculty Associate at the same structure. Starting in 2024, he joined, as affiliate faculty, the Institute for Digital Cooperative Economy (The New School), part of the Platform Cooperativism Consortium.

== Activism and social engagement ==
As an activist, Hassan has been engaged in both offline (La Tabacalera de Lavapiés, Medialab-Prado) and online (Ourproject.org, Barrapunto, Wikipedia) initiatives. He was accredited as a grassroots facilitator by the Altekio Cooperative. He co-founded the Comunes Nonprofit in 2009 and the Move Commons webtool project in 2010. He has co-organized practitioner-oriented workshops on platform co-ops and free/open source decentralized tools for communities, and has presented his work in non-academic conferences of Mozilla, the Internet Archive, and others. As a privacy advocate, he co-created a course on cyber-ethics which has been teaching since 2013 (as of 2021). He was co-founder of the Sci-Fdi Spanish science-fiction magazine. His gender is non-binary and uses he/they pronouns.

== Work ==
Hassan's interdisciplinary research spans multiple fields, including online communities, online governance, online collaboration, decentralized technologies, blockchain-based decentralized autonomous organizations, free/libre/open source software, Commons-based peer production, agent-based social simulation, social movements and cyberethics. He has published more than 60 works in these fields.

Hassan's PhD thesis focused on the methodological challenges for building data-driven social simulation models. The main model built simulated the transition from modern values to postmodern values in Spain. His methodological work also explored the combination of different artificial intelligence technologies, i.e. software agents with fuzzy logic, data mining, natural language processing, and microsimulation.

In his postdoctoral period, he focused on experimenting with multiple software systems to facilitate the collaborative economy, e.g. semantic-web labelling for commons-based initiatives, distribution of value in peer production communities, agent-supported online assemblies, decentralized real-time collaborative software, decentralized blockchain based reputation, or blockchain-enabled commons governance.

Hassan was Principal Investigator of the UCM partner in the EU-funded P2Pvalue project on building decentralized web-tools for collaborative communities. As such, he led the team that created SwellRT, a federated backend-as-a-service focused to ease development of apps featuring real-time collaboration. Intellectual Property of this project was transferred to the Apache Software Foundation in 2017. As part of this research line, Hassan's team also develop two SwellRT-based apps, "Teem" for management of social collectives and Jetpad, a federated real time editor. He presented the innovations concerning these software at Harvard's Berkman Klein Center and Harvard's Center for Research on Computation and Society.

Other research lines offered outcomes beyond publications. "Wikichron", coled by Javier Arroyo, is a web tool to visualize MediaWiki community metrics, currently in production and available for third-parties. "Decentralized Science", led by Hassan's PhD student Ámbar Tenorio-Fornés, is a framework to facilitate decentralized infrastructure and open peer review in the scientific publication process, which has been selected by the European Commission to receive funding as a spin-off social enterprise. His research on blockchain and crowdfunding models awarded him with a commission from Triple Canopy. His team pushed forward a mapping of the ecosystem of blockchain for social good, led by the Joint Research Centre and published by the European Commission.

As part of his ERC project P2P Models, Hassan and his team –including Silvia Semenzin– are investigating whether blockchain technology and Decentralized Autonomous Organizations could contribute to improving the governance of commons-oriented communities, both online and offline. Their work has been showcased for tackling the impact of blockchain on governance, proposing alternatives to the current sharing economy, emerging forms of techno-social systems like NFTs or prediction markets, or giving relevance to gender issues in the field. Hassan was invited to present the project achievements in Harvard Kennedy School, MIT Media Lab, Harvard's Data Privacy Lab, Harvard's Center for Research on Computation and Society, and Harvard's SEAS EconCS. British MP and Opposition Leader Ed Miliband showcased his research and its potential impact on policy. The project made public its way of organizing and its core values. In particular, it has shown a commitment to diversity as a core value in hiring, or choosing case studies.

== Selected works ==
- Arroyo, Javier; Davó, David; Martínez-Vicente, Elena; Faqir-Rhazoui, Youssef; Hassan, Samer (8 November 2022). "DAO-Analyzer: Exploring Activity and Participation in Blockchain Organizations" (PDF). Companion Publication of the 2022 Conference on Computer Supported Cooperative Work and Social Computing. CSCW'22 Companion. New York, NY, USA: Association for Computing Machinery. pp. 193–196. doi:10.1145/3500868.3559707. ISBN 978-1-4503-9190-0.
- Rozas, David; Tenorio-Fornés, Antonio; Díaz-Molina, Silvia; Hassan, Samer (2021). "When Ostrom Meets Blockchain: Exploring the Potentials of Blockchain for Commons Governance". SAGE Open. 11 (1): 215824402110025. doi:10.1177/21582440211002526. ISSN 2158-2440.
- Faqir-Rhazoui, Youssef; Ariza-Garzón, Miller-Janny; Arroyo, Javier; Hassan, Samer (8 May 2021). "Effect of the Gas Price Surges on User Activity in the DAOs of the Ethereum Blockchain" (PDF). Extended Abstracts of the 2021 CHI Conference on Human Factors in Computing Systems. CHI EA '21. New York, NY, USA: Association for Computing Machinery. pp. 1–7. doi:10.1145/3411763.3451755. ISBN 978-1-4503-8095-9.
- Hassan, Samer; Filippi, Primavera De (20 April 2021). "Decentralized Autonomous Organization". Internet Policy Review. 10 (2). doi:10.14763/2021.2.1556. hdl:10419/235960. ISSN 2197-6775.
- Joint Research Centre (European Commission); Hassan, Samer; Hakami, Anna; Brekke, Jaya Klara; De Filippi, Primavera; Lopéz Morales, Genoveva; Pólvora, Alexandre; Orgaz Alonso, Christian; Bodó, Balázs (2020). Scanning the European ecosystem of distributed ledger technologies for social and public good: what, why, where, how, and ways to move forward. LU: Publications Office of the European Union. doi:10.2760/300796. ISBN 978-92-76-21578-3.
- Filippi, Primavera De; Hassan, Samer (14 November 2016). "Blockchain technology as a regulatory technology: From code is law to law is code". First Monday. arXiv:1801.02507. doi:10.5210/fm.v21i12.7113. ISSN 1396-0466.

== See also ==
- P2Pvalue project at WikiMedia Meta
- SwellRT
- Decentralized autonomous organization
- Berkman Klein Center for Internet & Society
