= Real Colegio Complutense =

Harvard University exchange program

Real Colegio Complutense at Harvard University
- Established: 1990
- Research type: Post-Doctoral Advanced Research Institute
- Field of research: All areas of Science
- Director: Prof. Daniel Pablo de la Cruz Sánchez Mata
- Location: 26 Trowbridge, Cambridge, Massachusetts, 02138
- Affiliations: Harvard University; Complutense University of Madrid; Universidad Politécnica de Madrid; University of Valencia; Universidad de Alcalá de Henares; Universidad de Sevilla; University of Oviedo

The Real Colegio Complutense at Harvard University (RCC) in Cambridge, Massachusetts is an academic institution aimed at providing intellectual exchange between Harvard and the Spanish Academia. It is named after Spanish largest university, the Universidad Complutense de Madrid, which established it in cooperation with Harvard University.

== History ==
The RCC was founded as a joint cooperative institution to foster intellectual and scientific interaction between Harvard University and the Universidad Complutense de Madrid (UCM), with the support of King Juan Carlos I, Queen Sofía of Spain and the Commonwealth of Massachusetts. It follows the tradition of the Royal Spanish College, founded in 1364 to host Spanish Visiting Scholars at the University of Bologna. In November 1990, the Dean of the Universidad Complutense de Madrid at the time and the then-president of Harvard, Derek Curtis Bok, signed an alliance to create the Real Colegio Complutense. The King of Spain inaugurated the building in 1993 and the agreement was extended in 2009.

RCC Building

== Members ==
The RCC accord is the only one of its sort ever to have been approved by Harvard. The institution is directed jointly by the President of Harvard and the Rector of Complutense University. The RCC academic and advisory councils include outstanding members from both universities.

In the last decade, the RCC has incorporated new Partner Universities on top of UCM: the Universidad Politécnica de Madrid, Universidad de Alcalá de Henares, University of Valencia, University of Oviedo, and Universidad de Sevilla, each of them represented by official delegates.

As of 2024, the director is Daniel Pablo de la Cruz Sánchez Mata, full professor at UCM and faculty associate at the Harvard University Herbaria. In the period 2012–2021, the director was Prof. José Manuel Martínez Sierra, Jean Monnet ad personam Professor for the Study of European Union Law and Government.

== Mission ==
Every year, the RCC offers research grants to a select number of Spanish scholars who conduct their research at Harvard as visiting scholars. It also offers a number of graduate fellowships to Spanish students who attend the different graduate schools at Harvard. In addition to this, faculty and researchers from the partner universities and other affiliated centers are eligible to become RCC Fellows, enjoying the same privileges as Harvard's non-tenured Faculty.

The RCC sponsors a number of research projects and programs that cross over different fields of study, including experimental and social sciences, architecture, health, engineering, education, communication and humanities. The relevance of RCC Fellows, Associates and Alumni/ae, as well as their partnerships with local scholars and the Faculty of Harvard University, allow these projects to generate international knowledge networks and to promote intellectual exchange in a multidisciplinary framework.

As part of this framework, the institution hosts academic lectures and scientific events for an open audience, including Harvard professors and students.

Some notable RCC fellows include: Adela Balderas, Ignacio M. Llorente, Samer Hassan, and Javier Moreno Luzón. Notable members of its academic council are: Gonzalo Giribet, David W. Kennedy and the different rectors of UCM. Notable members of its advisory council include: Mark C. Elliott, Pol Antràs, Iñaki Ábalos, Alberto Abadie, Luis Viceira.

== Collaborations ==
The RCC has signed several agreements with Spanish and International Institutions to organize summer seminars and workshops at the center. These institutions include the ISDI (Instituto Superior para el Desarrollo de Internet), the Fundación Rafael del Pino, the Institute for Ethics in Communication and Organizations (IECO), the International Academic Program of the Universidad Autónoma de Madrid and the Centro de Investigaciones Sociológicas.
