= Comunes Collective =

Nonprofit organization

- Formation: September 2009
- Type: Non-profit association
- Purpose: Commons
- Location: Madrid, Spain
- Origins: Ourproject.org
- Region served: Worldwide
- Method: Free/libre web tools and free resources
- Website: www.comunes.org

Comunes is a nonprofit organization aiming to encourage the commons and facilitating grassroots work through free software web tools. Previously known as Ourproject.org, this collective established itself as a legal entity in 2009, forming Comunes. Nowadays it serves as an umbrella organization for several projects related to the Commons.

== Philosophy and Values ==
The objectives of the Communes include providing legal protection to member projects, together with technical infrastructure. The organization claims to be inspired by Software in the Public Interest organization, which provides similar protection to free software projects. Comunes member projects must focus on encouraging the protection or expansion of the Commons. Comunes Manifesto shows a view on the social movements as nodes in a social network, analysing which problems this ecosystem has and proposing Comunes web tools for diminishing them.

== Projects ==
=== Ourproject.org ===
Ourproject.org is a web-based collaborative free content repository. It serves as a central platform offering web space and tools for projects of any topic, with a focus on free culture and free knowledge. It provides web space and tools for projects of any kind, focusing on free culture and knowledge. It provides multiple web services such as hosting, mailing lists, wiki, ftp, and forums to an online community of social, cultural, artistic, and educational projects, as long as they share their content under Creative Commons or other free/libre licenses. Active since 2002, Ourproject.org hosts 1,200 projects and receives more than 1 million visits per month.

=== Kune ===
Kune is a software platform for federated social networking and collaborative work, focusing on workgroups rather than in individuals. Kune aims to allow the creation of online spaces of collaborative work, where organizations and individuals can build projects online, coordinate common agendas, set up virtual meetings and join organizations with similar interests. It is programmed using GWT, on top of the XMPP protocol and integrating Wave-In-A-Box. Licensed under AGPL, it has been under development since 2007 and it launched a beta and production site in April 2012.

=== Move Commons ===
Move Commons (MC) is a web tool for initiatives, collectives, and NGOs to declare and make visible their core principles. The idea behind MC follows the same mechanics of Creative Commons tagging cultural works, providing a user-friendly, bottom-up, labelling system for each initiative, with four meaningful icons and some keywords. It aims to boost the visibility and diffusion of such initiatives, and build a network among related initiatives/collectives, allowing mutual discovery. Additionally, newcomers could easily understand the collective approach in their website, or discover collectives matching their field/location/interests with a semantic search. It has been presented in several forums. Nowadays it is in beta version, but there are already a few organizations using their MC badges.

=== Other projects ===
Comunes includes other newer projects such as Alerta, the community-driven alert system, Plantaré, the community currency for seed exchange, and others.

== Partners ==
Comunes has developed partnership with several organizations:

- GRASIA (Group of Software Agents, Engineering & Applications): Research group of Universidad Complutense de Madrid, it is collaborating with Comunes to offer joint grants to students and provide hardware resources.
- American University of Science and Technology (Beirut): offering students the chance to frame their senior project and Master theses within Comunes projects.
- The Master of Free Software of Universidad Rey Juan Carlos (Madrid): offering students the chance to complete their compulsory Master internships in the free software community of Comunes projects.
- Medialab-Prado: Serves as a forum to present Comunes initiatives. One of them, Move Commons, is part of their Commons Lab.
- IEPALA Foundation: It has hired a programmer for the development of Kune and provides technical resources for an alpha-testing environment.
- Xsto.info: Free software cooperative that provides technical infrastructure to Comunes without charge.

== See also ==
- Commons
- Commons-based peer production
- Ourproject
- Kune (software)
- Software in the Public Interest
