= Kune (software) =

Open source software

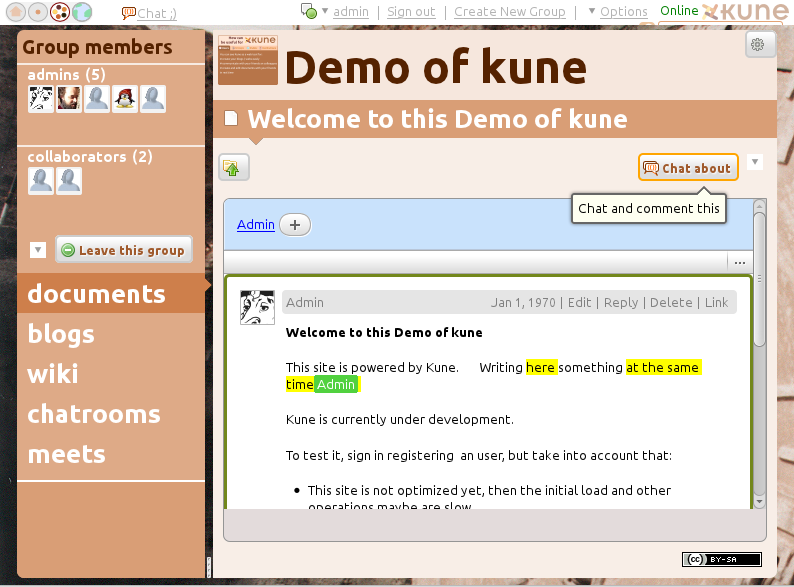
- Screenshot
- Original author: Comunes Collective
- Developers: Comunes Collective, IEPALA Foundation
- Release: 2007; 19 years ago
- Stable release: 1.0.0 (Codename "free-riders") / March 18, 2015; 11 years ago
- Written in: Java-based Google Web Toolkit
- Platform: Cross-platform
- Available in: Multi-language (more than 10)
- Type: Web application Collaborative software Distributed social network
- License: AGPLv3
- Website: kune.cc
- Repository: github.com/comunes/kune

Kune was a free/open source distributed social network focused on online real-time collaborative editing, decentralized social networking and web publishing in workgroups. It aimed to allow for the creation of online spaces for collaborative work where organizations and individuals can build projects online, coordinate common agendas, set up virtual meetings, publish on the web, and join organizations with similar interests. It had a focus on Free Culture and social movements needs. Kune was a project of the Comunes Collective. The project seems abandoned since 2017, with no new commits, blog entries or site activity.

== Technical details ==
Kune was programmed using the Java-based GWT in the client-side, integrating Apache Wave (formerly Google Wave) and using mainly the open protocols XMPP and Wave Federation Protocol. GWT Java sources on the client side generates obfuscated and optimized JavaScript conforming a single page application. Wave extensions (gadgets, bots) run on top of Kune (as in Facebook apps) and can be programmed in Java+GWT, JavaScript or Python.

The last version was under development since 2007 until 2017. The code was hosted in the GIT of Gitorious, with a development site and its main node maintained by the Comunes Collective.

Kune is 100% free software and was built only using free software. Its software is licensed under the AGPL license, while the art is under a Creative Commons BY-SA.

== Philosophy ==
Kune was born in order to face a growing concern from the community behind it. Nowadays, groups (a group of friends, activists, a NGO, a small start-up) that need to work together typically will use multiple free (like beer) commercial centralized for-profit services (e.g. Google Docs, Google Groups, Facebook, Wordpress.com, Dropbox, Flickr, eBay ...) in order to communicate and collaborate online. However, "If you're not paying for it, you're the product". In order to avoid that, such groups of users may ask a technical expert to build them mailing lists, a webpage and maybe to set up an etherpad. However, technicians are needed for any new list (as they cannot configure e.g. GNU Mailman), configuration change, etc., creating a strong dependency and ultimately a bottleneck.

Kune aims to cover all those needs of groups to communicate and collaborate, in a usable way and thus without depending on technical experts. It aims to be a free/libre web service (and thus in the cloud), but decentralized as email, so a user can choose the server they want and still interoperate transparently with the rest.

Opposite to most distributed social networks, this software focuses on collaboration and building, not only on communication and sharing. Thus, Kune does not aim to ultimately replace Facebook, but also all the above-mentioned commercial services. Kune has a strong focus on the construction of Free Culture and eventually facilitate Commons-based peer production.

== History ==
Version	Code name	Release date
0.0.1	--	2007
0.0.9	15M	2011-08-04
0.1.0	99%	2012-04-13
0.2.0	Ostrom	2012-10-22
1.0.0	"Free-riders"	2015-03-18
Unsupported Supported Latest version Future version

The origin of Kune relies on the community behind Ourproject.org. Ourproject aimed to provide for Free Culture (social/cultural projects) what SourceForge and other software forges meant for free software: a collection of communication and collaboration tools that would boost the emergence of community-driven free projects. However, although Ourproject was relatively successful, it was far from the original aims. The analysis of the situation in 2005 concluded that only the groups that had a techie among them (who would manage Mailman or install a CMS) were able to move forward, while the rest would abandon the service. Thus, new free collaborative tools were needed, more usable and suitable for anyone, as the available free tools required a high degree of technical expertise. This is why Kune, whose name means "together" in Esperanto, was developed.

The first prototypes of Kune were developed using Ruby on Rails and Pyjamas (later known as Pyjs). However, with the release of Java and the Google Web Toolkit as free software, the community embraced these technologies since 2007. In 2009, with a stable codebase and about to release a major version of Kune, Google announced the Google Wave project and promised it would be released as free software. Wave was using the same technologies of Kune (Java + GWT, Guice, XMPP protocol) so it would be easy to integrate after its release. Besides, Wave was offering an open federated protocol, easy extensibility (through gadgets), easy control versioning, and very good real-time edition of documents. Thus, the community decided to halt the development of Kune, and wait for its release... in the meanwhile developing gadgets that would be integrated in Kune later on. In this same period, the community established the Comunes Association (with an acknowledged inspiration in Software in the Public Interest) as a non-profit legal umbrella for free software tools for encouraging the Commons and facilitating the work of social movements. The umbrella covered Ourproject, Kune and Move Commons, together with some other minor projects.

In November 2010, the free Apache Wave (previously Wave-in-a-Box) was released, under the umbrella of the Apache Foundation. Since then, the community began integrating its source code within the Kune previous codebase, and with the support of the IEPALA Foundation. Kune released its Beta and moved to production in April 2012.

Since then, Kune has been catalogued as "activism 2.0" and citizen tool, a tool for NGOs, multi-tool for general purpose (and following that, criticized for the risk of falling on the second-system effect) and example of the new paradigm. It was selected as "open website of the week" by the Open University of Catalonia, and as one of the #Occupy Tech projects. Nowadays, there are plans of another federated social network, Lorea (based on Elgg), to connect with Kune.

== Feature list ==
- All the functionalities of Apache Wave, that is collaborative federated real-time editing, plus
- Communication
  - Chat and chatrooms compatible with Gmail and Jabber through XMPP (with several XEP extensions), as it integrates Emite
  - Social networking (federated)
- Real-time collaboration for groups in:
  - Documents: as in Google Docs
  - Wikis
  - Lists: as in Google Groups but minimizing emails, through waves
  - Group Tasks
  - Group Calendar: as in Google Calendar, with ical export
  - Group Blogs
  - Web-creation: aiming to publish contents directly on the web (as in WordPress, with a dashboard and public view) (in development)
  - Bartering: aiming to decentralize bartering as in eBay
- Advanced email
  - Waves: aims to replace most uses of email
  - Inbox: as in email, all your conversations and documents in all kunes are controlled from your inbox
  - Email notifications (Projected: replies from email)
- Multimedia & Gadgets
  - Image or Video galleries integrated in any doc
  - Maps, mindmaps, Twitter streams, etc.
  - Polls, voting, events, etc.
  - and more via Apache Wave extensions, easy to program (as in Facebook apps, they run on top of Kune)
- Federation
  - Distributed Social Networking the same way as e-mail: from one inbox you control all your activity in all kunes, and you can collaborate with anyone or any group regardless of the kune where they were registered.
  - Interoperable with any Kune server or Wave-based system
  - Chat interoperable with any XMPP server
- Usability
  - Strong focus on usability for any user
  - Animated tutorials for each tool
  - Drag&Drop for sharing contents, add users to a doc, change roles, delete contents, etc.
  - Shortcuts
- Free culture
  - Developed using free software and released under AGPL
  - Easy assistant for choosing content licenses for groups. Default license is Creative Commons BY-SA.
- Developer-friendly
  - Debian/Ubuntu package for easy installation
  - Wave Gadgets can be programmed in Java+GWT, JavaScript or Python

== Supporters and adopters ==
Kune has the active support of several organizations and institutions:

- Comunes Association, whose community is behind Kune development. It used to host a Kune server for free projects.
- IEPALA Foundation, which was supporting the development with economical and technical resources. It used to host a Kune server for non-governmental organizations.
- Grasia Software Agent Research Group of the Complutense University of Madrid provided technical resources.
- Interns from the Master of Free Software from the King Juan Carlos University participated in the development.
- Trainees from the American University of Science and Technology (Lebanon) participated in the system administration.
- Paulo Freire Institute in Brazil participated in the early design and prototypes.
- The Kune workgroup of the Medialab Prado participated in the beta-testing.

== See also ==
- Apache Wave
- Comunes Collective
- Distributed social network
- Comparison of software and protocols for distributed social networking
- Ourproject.org
- Wave Federation Protocol
