= Juan Pavón =

Spanish computer scientist (b.1962)

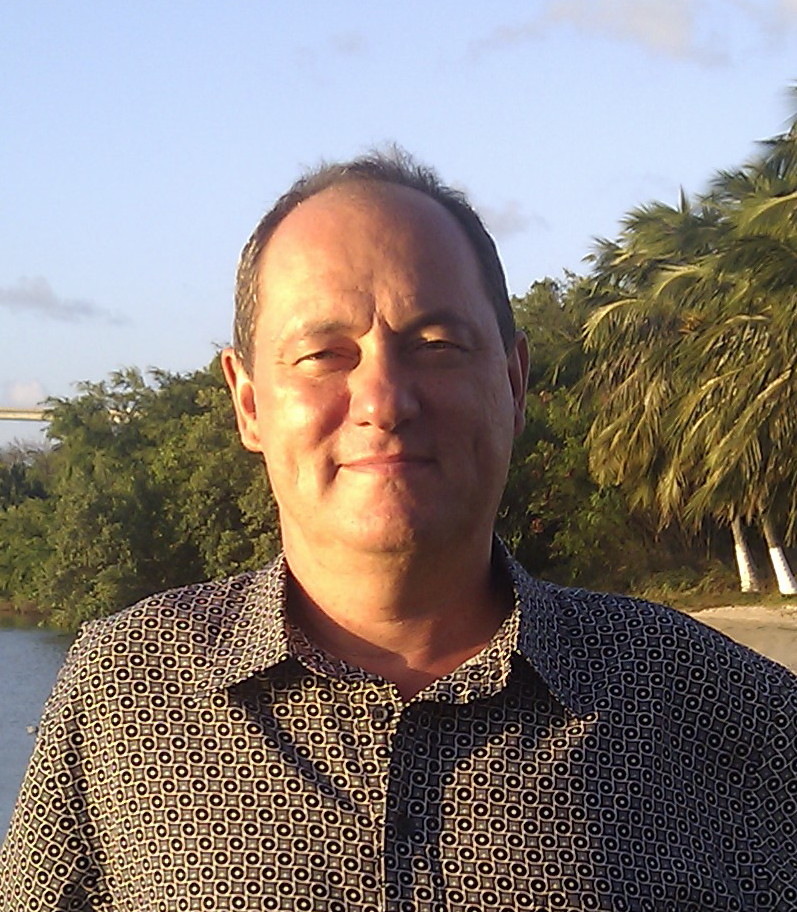
- Born: Juan Pavón Mestras; 19 November 1962 (age 63); Algeciras, Spain
- Education: Technical University of Madrid, Université Pierre et Marie Curie
- Known for: Software agents, Metamodelling, Artificial intelligence applications
- Scientific career
- Fields: Computer science, Software agents, Artificial Intelligence
- Workplaces: Complutense University of Madrid
- Website: https://grasia.fdi.ucm.es/jpavon/es/index.html

Juan Pavón (born 19 November 1962) is a Spanish computer scientist, full professor of the Complutense University of Madrid (UCM). He is a pioneer researcher in the field of Software Agents, co-creator of the FIPA MESSAGE and INGENIAS methodologies, and founder and director of the research group GRASIA: GRoup of Agent-based, Social and Interdisciplinary Applications at UCM. He is known for his work in the field of Artificial Intelligence, specifically in agent-oriented software engineering. He has been often cited by mainstream media, as a reference in Artificial Intelligence.

== Biography ==
=== Education ===
Pavón belongs to the first Spanish generation to get official studies in Computer Science, during the 1980s. He studied Computer Science at the Technical University of Madrid, graduating in 1985. In 1988, he obtained his PhD in this area with the thesis: "Synthesis of communication protocols from service specifications". While doing this thesis, he worked as assistant professor at the same university. After his PhD, he joined Alcatel-Lucent R&D team, where he worked for 10 years. At the end of 1997 he got an Associate Professor position at UCM, and in 2006, he achieved the Habilitation à diriger des recherches qualification in Computer Science at the Université Pierre et Marie Curie (Paris VI) with the thesis "INGENIAS : Développement Dirigé par Modèles des Systèmes Multi-Agents" (in French).

=== Career ===
He joined the Alcatel R&D department as a systems engineer. There, he worked on the development of software component-based architectures for distributed systems, and its applications for multimedia services over broadband networks and new generation mobile phones. During the 10 years he worked for the company, he spent periods in Alcatel centers outside Spain, such as France (Lannion and Vélizy) and Belgium (Namur and Antwerp). In this period, he worked several years in the labs of Bellcore in Red Bank, New Jersey (USA), working in the TINA-C Core Team, and helping to produce architectural models for telecommunication services. As a result, he published several popular works.

He then returned to the academic world, as an Associate Professor at the Computer Science School of the Complutense University of Madrid (1997). By then, he researched Multi-Agent Systems within the Eurescom project P815 "Communications Management Process Integration Using Software Agents" (1999) working with Telefónica R+D. His work in several projects combines software engineering practices and MAS. In the Eurescom P907 "Methodology for Engineering Systems of Software Agents", he co-created the MESSAGE methodology, currently part of the main FIPA software agent methodologies.

In 2000 he established the research group GRASIA for the research in Software Agents and Artificial Intelligence in the Complutense University of Madrid. He also held several management positions in the university, serving as Vice Dean for four years (1998–2002). Nowadays, he is full professor at the Universidad Complutense Madrid.

== Work ==
=== Software Agents Research ===
Pavón work has focused on Software Agents and Agent-based simulation. His work on Software Agents started at the end of the 1990s, after they emerge as a new paradigm. His first project in the area was funded by Telefonica R+D, "Communications Management Process Integration Using Software Agents" (1999). Later he attracted funding for research projects from the 5th European Framework Programme (PSI3, DEMOS) and from Euroscom (P815, P907), all considered early applications of agents to software engineering processes. In the Eurescom P907 "Methodology for Engineering Systems of Software Agents", he co-created the MESSAGE methodology, currently part of the main FIPA software agent methodologies.

=== INGENIAS ===
His main contribution combining agent concepts in software engineering is the INGENIAS methodology and toolkit. INGENIAS (Engineering for Software Agents) is a complete framework for the analysis, design and implementation of multi-agent systems (MAS).

As a result of the research in these years, Jorge J. Gómez-Sanz published in 2002 his PhD thesis "A Methodology for the Development of Multi-Agent Systems" (in Spanish) advised by Francisco Garijo and Juan Pavón. This work constitutes the first version of the INGENIAS methodology and its meta-models.

INGENIAS adopts since its inception a model-driven engineering (MDE) approach. Model-driven engineering (MDE) organizes developments around the specification of systems through models that are automatically transformed to generate other artefacts, e.g., code, tests, or documentation. INGENIAS follows these principles specifying the MAS meta-models that define its modeling language and allow generating automatically its development tools distributed as the INGENIAS Development Kit (IDK). This approach supports research in different areas characterized by the use of modeling languages and requiring flexibility to adapt these to new requirements. Thus, it has been also used in Agent-based simulation. INGENIAS development process has been one of the few processes of agent-oriented methodologies in having their development process formally specified with SPEM, a language of the Object Management Group (OMG). Currently, there is one development process based on the Unified Process and another based on Scrum.

The INGENIAS modeling language and the open-source tools for its application made it a popular methodology in the agent literature. It has been included in relevant surveys and comparisons in the field. The open-source INGENIAS associated tools are also successful in the agent community, as assessed by their number of downloads.

=== Agent-based social simulation ===
The level of maturity reached by the INGENIAS framework and related tools, mainly INGENME, in its application to Software Agents, allowed the GRASIA group to consider its application to other domains. Agent-based simulation has been one with an immediate application. As in Software Agents, agent-based simulation (ABS) relies on the concept of agent, in this case as the basic block to build computational simulations. The conceptual similarities between the concept of agent in both disciplines, and the suitability of models to work with simulations, made of agent-based simulation a sensible extension for INGENIAS work.

This line of research started in GRASIA with a direct application of the works in INGENIAS with software agents to ABS for the PhD thesis of Candelaria Sansores "A Methodology for the Study of Artificial Societies" (2007), advised by Pavonl. This work pointed out the suitability of applying the MDE approach of INGENIAS to this field, but also the problems of researchers without a background on Software Engineering to use INGENIAS. These first attempts were oriented to simulations intended to verify behavioral principles described by well-known laws, but not to explore simulations based on the use of big amounts of raw data. This data-driven agent-based social simulation was the subject of the interdisciplinary PhD thesis of Samer Hassan "Towards a Data Driven Approach for Agent Based Modelling: Simulating Spanish Postmodernization", also advised by Juan Pavón.

The use of INGENIAS for ABS is based on the adoption of MDE to build simulations. This approach was developed and validated by GRASIA in different domains, e.g., urbanism and group work.

=== Other research and activity ===
He has achieved multiple agreements with relevant research groups: ICAR-CNR, SenSysCal.it, INSISOC, SMAC. and industry such as Telefonica R+D or Boeing Research and Technology Europe. His topics of interest cover several disciplines, including simulation of complex systems, agent-oriented software engineering, artificial intelligent applications, Responsible Research and Innovation, Ethics in AI, Smart Cities, Blockchain, Legal Tech and inclusion tech.

== Scientific recognitions ==
Pavón joined the European research networks on Software Agents and Agent-based simulation, AgentLink and AgentCities, and has contributed to different international projects funded by the European Commission: VITAL, MOMOCS, PSI3, DEMOS, AGENTCITIES.NET, P2Pvalue.

He has worked on more than 30 research projects, leading 20 of them, with public and private funding. He accounts more than 260 scientific publications, and an H-index of 34. He is a research consultant for dozens of committees and part of the editorial board of several journals in the field of computer science. He is member of the Spanish Association for Artificial Intelligence., the European Social Simulation Association, the FIPA board, the European Association for the Study of Science and Technology, the IEEE Computer Society, and scientific project evaluator of the European Commission.

In 2006 he received an honorary PhD from the Université Pierre et Marie Curie (París 6).

His research group GRASIA has achieved some recognition through several awards:

- The AAMAS 2008 Best Academic Software Demo for INGENIAS.
- Second prize in the contest Robotrader organized by the Technical University of Madrid 2012.
- Selection by the IEEE Special Technical Community on Social Networks as featured article in October 2012.
- Best paper award in the 19th edition of the Semantic Search Workshop 2010 of the World Wide Web Conference.

== Selected publications ==
Pavón is author of several books and more than 260 scientific articles on Software Agents, Artificial Intelligence and Software Engineering. A selection of highly cited works are:

- Pavón, Juan; Gómez-Sanz, Jorge; Fernández-Caballero, Antonio; Valencia-Jiménez, Julián J. (2007). "Development of intelligent multisensor surveillance systems with agents". Robotics and Autonomous Systems. 55 (12): 892–903. doi:10.1016/j.robot.2007.07.009. hdl:10578/2164. ISSN 0921-8890.
- Pavón, Juan; Gómez-Sanz, Jorge (2003). "Agent Oriented Software Engineering with INGENIAS". In Mařík, Vladimír; Pěchouček, Michal; Müller, Jörg (eds.). Multi-Agent Systems and Applications III. Lecture Notes in Computer Science. Vol. 2691. Springer Berlin Heidelberg. pp. 394–403. doi:10.1007/3-540-45023-8_38. ISBN 978-3-540-45023-8.
- Caire, Giovanni; Coulier, Wim; Garijo, Francisco; Gomez, Jorge; Pavon, Juan; Leal, Francisco; Chainho, Paulo; Kearney, Paul; Stark, Jamie; Evans, Richard; Massonet, Philippe (2002). "Agent Oriented Analysis Using Message/UML". In Wooldridge, Michael J.; Weiß, Gerhard; Ciancarini, Paolo (eds.). Agent-Oriented Software Engineering II. Lecture Notes in Computer Science. Vol. 2222. Springer Berlin Heidelberg. pp. 119–135. doi:10.1007/3-540-70657-7_8. ISBN 978-3-540-70657-1.
- Beydoun, G.; Low, G.; Henderson-Sellers, B.; Mouratidis, H.; Gomez-Sanz, J. J.; Pavon, J.; Gonzalez-Perez, C. (November 2009). "FAML: A Generic Metamodel for MAS Development" (PDF). IEEE Transactions on Software Engineering. 35 (6): 841–863. Bibcode:2009ITSEn..35..841B. doi:10.1109/TSE.2009.34. ISSN 2326-3881. S2CID 14479364.
- Corchado, Juan M.; Pavón, Juan; Corchado, Emilio S.; Castillo, Luis F. (2004). "Development of CBR-BDI Agents: A Tourist Guide Application". In Funk, Peter; González Calero, Pedro A. (eds.). Advances in Case-Based Reasoning. Lecture Notes in Computer Science. Vol. 3155. Springer Berlin Heidelberg. pp. 547–559. doi:10.1007/978-3-540-28631-8_40. hdl:10366/135105. ISBN 978-3-540-28631-8.

== See also ==
- INGENIAS
- Foundation for Intelligent Physical Agents
- Multi-agent system
