= Silvia Semenzin =

Italian author and activist (born 1991)

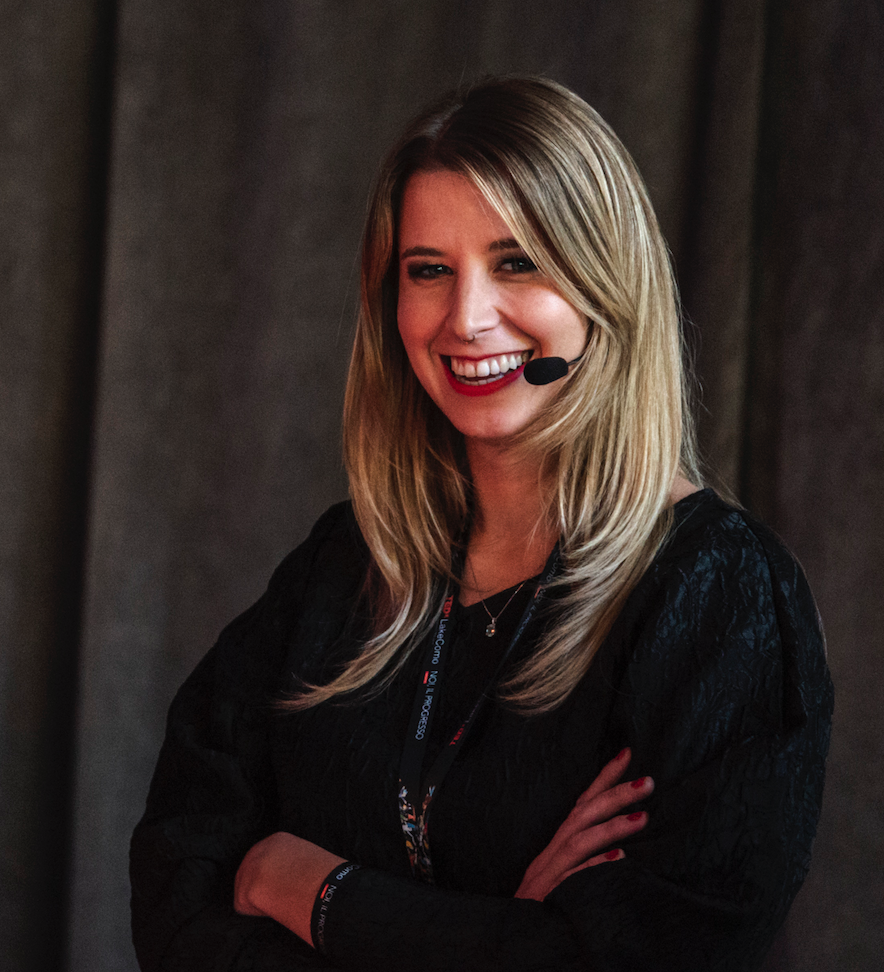
- Born: 24 October 1991 (age 34); Montebelluna, Italy
- Education: University of Milan, University of Turin
- Known for: Image based sexual abuse
- Scientific career
- Fields: Image based sexual abuse, Blockchain
- Workplaces: Universidad Complutense de Madrid
- Doctoral advisor: Paola Alessandra Rebughini, Alessandro Gandini
- Website: https://www.silviasemenzin.it

Silvia Semenzin is an Italian author, scholar and activist, whose work focuses on gender-related violence, digital rights, and emerging technologies, especially blockchain. She is best known for her research and advocacy on image-based sexual abuse (revenge porn), which prompted the Italian law on the topic.

== Education and career ==
Semenzin studied a BA in Political Science at the University of Padua, with an Erasmus exchange at the Complutense University of Madrid (UCM). She studied an MA in Social Communication at the same UCM, and later a joint PhD in Digital Sociology by both the University of Milan and the University of Turin. Her PhD explored the blockchain imaginaries, examining power dynamics and algorithmic discrimination in digitally-mediated contexts.

During her PhD, she worked for the University of Trento researching cybercrime. She also collaborated with the ERC grant team of Stefania Milan at the University of Amsterdam, with data-tracking of Pornhub. In this period she researched image-based sexual abuse in Telegram groups, which drew international attention.

After her PhD, she worked as a postdoctoral researcher at the UCM, in the ERC grant team of Samer Hassan, and as a lecturer at the University of Amsterdam. She later obtained a Juan de la Cierva post-doc scholarship to continue her work at UCM. In this period, she has continued her research on the social aspects of blockchain technologies, while trying to raise awareness on its dangers.

== Activism and social engagement ==
While doing research on image-based sexual abuse, she engaged in advocacy on the topic. In November 2018, she was promoter and spokesperson, with the aid of Amnesty International and other organizations, of the Italian national campaign “Intimità Violata” to ask for a law against image-based sexual abuse (revenge porn). An online petition gathered 80,000 signatories in two weeks, and gathered ample media attention. The campaign attracted the support of politicians like former President of the Parliament Laura Boldrini, especially after the dismissal of the Tiziana Cantone suicide case. A few months later, in April 2019 the Italian Parliament passed a law criminalizing image-based sexual abuse, rendering the campaign a success.

Since then, she has become an advocate on online gender-related violence matters, regularly speaking on international media like RTVE, Vanity Fair, Wired, GQ, ANSA, RAC 1, and others. She has spoken on the topic in multiple international forums, including two TED Talks, Amnesty International, Save the Children, the EU, or the global summit on the topic. She also played a key role in implementing a law against online sexual violence in Ecuador. She wrote a book on the topic, and in line with her appeals for better education on these issues, she co-founded an NGO on sex education.

Concerning her advocacy of digital rights, she sits on the board of the Dutch Cyber Rights Organization, which has advocated for non-discrimination clauses in the EU Artificial Intelligence Act. Besides, she has worked as a journalist for several digital newspapers, in Italy, Spain, and an US online debate platform.

== Selected works ==
=== Books ===
- Bainotti, Lucia; Semenzin, Silvia (2021). Donne tutte puttane: revenge porn e maschilità egemone. La città e la metropoli. Andria: Durango edizioni. ISBN 978-88-99476-49-6.

=== Articles ===
- Rama, Ilir; Bainotti, Lucia; Gandini, Alessandro; Giorgi, Giulia; Semenzin, Silvia; Agosti, Claudio; Corona, Giulia; Romano, Salvatore (2023-04-03). "The platformization of gender and sexual identities: an algorithmic analysis of Pornhub". Porn Studies. 10 (2): 154–173. doi:10.1080/23268743.2022.2066566. ISSN 2326-8743.
- Semenzin, Silvia; Rozas, David; Hassan, Samer (2022-07-26). "Blockchain-based application at a governmental level: disruption or illusion? The case of Estonia". Policy and Society. 41 (3): 386–401. doi:10.1093/polsoc/puac014. ISSN 1449-4035.
- Semenzin, Silvia; Gandini, Alessandro (2021-02-01). "Automating Trust with the Blockchain? A Critical Investigation of "Blockchain 2.0" Cultures". Global Perspectives. 2 (1) 24912. doi:10.1525/gp.2021.24912. hdl:2434/854985.
- Semenzin, Silvia; Bainotti, Lucia (2020). "The Use of Telegram for Non-Consensual Dissemination of Intimate Images: Gendered Affordances and the Construction of Masculinities". Social Media + Society. 6 (4): 205630512098445. doi:10.1177/2056305120984453. hdl:2434/828495. ISSN 2056-3051.

== See also ==
- Online gender-based violence
- Revenge porn
