= SAP StreamWork =

- Developer(s): SAP SE
- Initial release: March 30, 2010
- Type: Web application
- Website: SAP StreamWork

SAP StreamWork is an enterprise collaboration tool from SAP SE released in March 2010, and discontinued in December 2015. StreamWork allowed real-time collaboration like Google Wave, but focused on business activities such as analyzing data, planning meetings, and making decisions. It incorporated technology from Box.net and Evernote to allow users to connect to online files and documents, and document-reader technology from Scribd allowed users to view documents directly within its environment.

StreamWork supported the OpenSocial set of application programming interfaces (APIs), allowing it to connect to tools built by third-party developers, such as Google Docs. A version of StreamWork intended for large enterprises used a virtual appliance based on Novell's SUSE Linux Enterprise to connect it to business systems, including those from SAP.

== See also ==
- Apache Wave
