= Milind Tambe =

American computer scientist

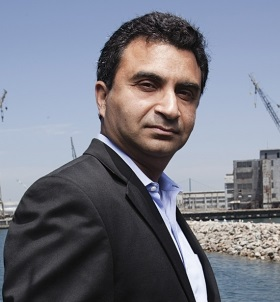
- Born: Maharashtra, India
- Citizenship: American
- Education: BITS Pilani; Carnegie Mellon University
- Awards: AAAI Award for Artificial Intelligence for the Benefit of Humanity (2024); AAAI Robert S Engelmore Award (2019); IJCAI John McCarthy Award (2018); ACM Fellow (2013); AAAI Fellow (2007); ACM SIGART Autonomous Agents Research Award (2005)
- Scientific career
- Fields: Artificial Intelligence; Computer Science
- Workplaces: University of Southern California; Harvard University
- Thesis: Eliminating combinatorics from production match (1991)
- Doctoral advisor: Allen Newell; Paul Rosenbloom
- Website: teamcore.seas.harvard.edu/tambe

Milind Shashikant Tambe is an Indian-American educator serving as a Professor of Computer Science at Harvard University. He also serves as the director of the Center for Research on Computation and Society at Harvard University and the director of "AI for Social Good" at Google Research India.

== Career ==
=== Memberships and awards ===
Tambe is a member of AAAI (Association for Advancement of Artificial Intelligence), as well as ACM (Association for Computing Machinery). He is also a recipient of the IJCAI John McCarthy Award, as well as the ACM SIGART Autonomous Agents Research Award. Additionally, he has been recognized by the AAAI (Association for Advancement of Artificial Intelligence)'s Robert S. Engelmore Memorial Lecture Award and the Christopher Columbus Fellowship Foundation Homeland Security Award. He has also received the Distinguished Alumnus Award from Birla Institute of Technology and Science (BITS).

=== Previous Positions ===
Previous to his position at Harvard and Google, he was a Professor of Engineering and a Professor of Computer Science and Industrial and Systems Engineering at the University of Southern California, Los Angeles.

== Research ==
Professor Tambe and team provided the first-ever applications of computational game theory for operational security. The first of these deployments was the ARMOR system of game-theoretic algorithms for security (e.g., counterterrorism) which started operating at the Los Angeles LAX airport in 2007, deployed by the LAX police division. This work was followed by pioneering deployments of security games for major security agencies such as the Federal Air Marshals Service, the US Coast Guard and the Transportation Security Administration.

Tambe and team were the first to apply AI models, specifically machine learning and game theory, for global scale anti-poaching efforts, as part of the PAWS project for wildlife conservation. The PAWS AI system has been deployed in collaboration with wildlife conservation agencies to assist rangers around the world. PAWS has helped rangers in removing 10s of 1000s of traps used to kill endangered wildlife in national parks in countries such Cambodia and Uganda.

== Bibliography ==
- Artificial Intelligence and Social Work (with E. Rice) Artificial Intelligence and Social Work, 2018. Cambridge University Press ISBN 1-108-42599-2
- Security and Game Theory: Algorithms, Deployed Systems, Lessons Learned (1st edition) 2011. Cambridge University Press, ISBN 1-107-09642-1
- Keep the Adversary Guessing: Agent Security by Policy Randomization 2008. VDM Verlag Dr. Mueller e.K., ISBN 3-639-01925-3
