= Ourproject.org =

Web-based collaborative repository

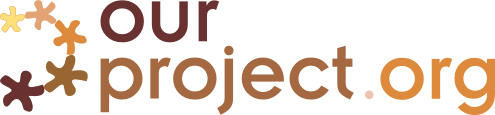
- Formation: 2002
- Type: Non-profit
- Purpose: Educational
- Headquarters: Madrid, Spain
- Region served: Worldwide
- Main organ: Assembly
- Affiliations: Member project of Comunes organization
- Website: OurProject.org

Ourproject.org is a web-based collaborative free content repository. It acts as a central location for the construction and maintenance of social/cultural/artistic projects, providing web space and tools, and focusing in free knowledge. It claims to extend the ideas and methodology of free software to social areas and free culture in general. Since September 2009, Ourproject is under the Comunes Association umbrella, and gave birth to the Kune collaborative social network for groups.

== Philosophy ==
Ourproject was founded in 2002 with the aims of hosting and boosting the cooperative work done in multiple domains (cultural, artistic, educational), with one specific condition: the results of the projects should remain freely accessible under a free license. This is understood in a broad way, as not all the available licenses are cataloged as free/libre (such as several Creative Commons licenses).

Its non-profit perspective is partially imposed on its online community of projects, as no advertising is allowed in the hosted webpages. Thus, Ourproject projects have mainly been carried out by social movements, university-supported groups, some free software related projects, cooperatives, artist collectives, activist groups, informal groups and non-profits.

== Current situation/Condition ==
As of 2026 administration is no longer answering emails and the project seems abandoned.

As of December 2016, Ourproject.org was hosting 1,733 projects and had 5,969 users, with a constant linear growth rate. and had a PageRank of 6 and the 14th position on public Gforge sites, being the first of them not restricted to just free software projects. In fact, the GNU Project highlights it as "Free knowledge & free culture" project. It claims to be the most successful wiki farm with full free version and without ads (comparison). It has presence especially in Spain, Latin America and China.

Relevant projects that are using Ourproject infrastructure include:

- the Critical Mass movement pages reference for the Hispanic movement
- The Spanish cooperative for Organic farming "Bajo el Asfalto está la Huerta", reference in the food sovereignty movement
- the Kune project, a federated collaborative social network
- the main Free Software association of Argentina
- The community website of the Ubuntu Spanish community
- the internal work group of the P2P Foundation.

During 2011, it has attracted interest by the new wave of protesting social movements in several areas:

- It has hosted several projects related to the Arab Spring movements from Lebanon, Palestine and Syria.
- The social movement of 2011 Spanish protests repeatedly used its services.

== Software used ==
Ourproject.org uses a multi-language multiple-topic adapted version of FusionForge. Its aim is to widen the spectrum of free software ideals, focusing on free social and cultural projects more than on free software. Thus, its software was originally a kind of social and multiple-topic forge following the free-culture movement. Nowadays, the Ourproject community has been involved in the development of the collaborative environment Kune and eventually this would cover all current Ourproject functionalities.

== Licenses allowed ==
The main condition for hosting projects at OP is that the content created during the project must be released under one of these licenses:

- Creative Commons, Attribution
- Creative Commons, Attribution-ShareAlike
- Creative Commons, Attribution-NonCommercial-ShareAlike
- GNU Free Documentation License (GFDL)
- Open Publication License
- Libre Designs General Public License (LDGPL)
- Design Science License
- Free Art License
- Artistic License
- GNU General Public License (GPL)
- GNU Lesser General Public License (LGPL)
- GNU Affero General Public License (AGPL)
- BSD License
- Mozilla Public License
- Public Domain
- No license

== Services ==
OP provides several free Internet services to free/libre projects collaborators:

- Web hosting with subdomain (projectname).ourproject.org or Virtual Hosting
- Mailing list
- Web Forums
- SSH account for full customization
- MySQL database
- permanent file archival (FTP)
- Wiki
- Web-administration
- E-mail Alias @users.ourproject.org
- Periodical full backups
- For software projects: SCM (CVS, SVN)

Other secondary services:

- Task management
- News service
- Documentation management
- Surveys
- Registering
- File publication system
- Stats

== Partners ==
Ourproject developed partnership with several organizations:

- GRASIA (Group of Software Agents, Engineering & Applications): Research group of Universidad Complutense de Madrid, it is offering joint grants to students and providing hardware resources.
- American University of Science and Technology (Beirut): offering students the chance of collaborating with Ourproject receiving trainings in administration, or framing their senior project and Master theses in this environment.
- IEPALA Foundation: It has joined Ourproject, together with other free software initiatives, to build a common data center.
- Xsto.info: Free software cooperative that has been providing technical infrastructure to Ourproject without charge, and recently joined the mentioned collective data center.

== See also ==
- Comunes Collective
- Free content
- Copyleft
- Open content
- Free software movement
- Open educational resources
- Gratis versus Libre
- Comparison of wiki farms
