= Novell Vibe =

Micro Focus Novell Vibe

- Developer(s): Novell
- Initial release: June 25, 2008; 16 years ago
- Type: Web application
- License: Proprietary
- Website: Novell Vibe

Novell Vibe is a web-based team collaboration platform developed by Novell. It was initially released by Novell in June 2008 under the name of Novell Teaming. Novell Vibe is a collaboration platform that can serve as a knowledge repository, document management system, project collaboration hub, process automation machine, corporate intranet or extranet. Users can upload, manage, comment on, and edit content securely.

Document management functionality allows for document versions, approvals, and document life cycle tracking. Users can download and modify pre-built custom web pages and workflows free of charge from the Vibe Resource Library.

As of 2022, Novell Vibe is now known as Micro Focus Vibe following the Novell acquisition.

Novell is now a part of OpenText.

== History ==
Novell Vibe was created as the result of two Novell products, Teaming and Pulse. They were merged into a single platform in 2010.

Created in 2009, Novell Pulse was a communication tool based on the Google Wave Federation Protocol.

== Compatibility ==
Novell Vibe is compatible across numerous servers, operating systems, web browsers, mobile devices, and Microsoft Office programs.

== Interoperability ==
Vibe can be used in conjunction with various other software products, such as Novell Access Manager, Novell GroupWise, Skype, and YouTube. Novell Vibe integrates with an LDAP directory for authentication.

== Extensibility ==
Vibe administrators or third-party developers can improve the Vibe software by creating software extensions, remote applications, or JAR files that extend the capabilities of the software.
