= List of cabinets of Lebanon =

The Council of Ministers of Lebanon, known informally as the Cabinet of Lebanon, is the chief executive body of the Republic of Lebanon.

== October 2004 cabinet ==
The cabinet came after the collapse of the Fifth cabinet of Rafic Hariri resigned in the uproar following the parliamentary extension of the presidency of Émile Lahoud for three years. The Karami cabinet itself fell six months later during the Cedar Revolution, which was sparked by the assassination of Rafik Hariri, the previous prime minister.

== April 2005 cabinet ==
A temporary Lebanese government was formed on 19 April 2005, after 50 days of the resignation of the Omar Karami government. The main goal of the cabinet was to supervise the 2005 Lebanese general election, so it was headed by Najib Mikati and 14 independent ministers.

== July 2005 cabinet ==
The July 2005, Lebanese cabinet was formed by Fouad Siniora on 19 July 2005 who was appointed by then president Émile Lahoud. All the main political blocs were included in it except for the Free Patriotic Movement-led bloc headed by General Michel Aoun. On 24 November 2007, the government became an interim one following the end of the president's mandate.

== July 2008 cabinet ==
The July 2008 Lebanese cabinet was formed by Fouad Siniora on 11 July 2008.

== November 2009 cabinet ==
In November 2009, after five months of negotiations following the 2009 parliamentary elections, Lebanese prime minister Saad Hariri formed a national unity government.

== June 2011 cabinet ==
On 13 June 2011, after five months of negotiations following the designation of Najib Mikati as prime minister, he formed a new government.

== February 2014 cabinet ==
It took 330 days of negotiations to form the Lebanese government, after the resignation of the previous Prime Minister, Najib Mikati, on March 22, 2013. The reason for these negotiations is respect for Lebanese political and confessional balances. The nomination of new Prime Minister by Parliament followed in two weeks of negotiations lasted after the fall of the previous government. Then, on 6 April, Tamman Salam was nominated as Prime Minister. He was consequently tasked by President Michel Suleiman to form a government. Despite his nomination by 124 of 128 MPs, Salam then failed to form a consensus government amidst political demands. Finally, on 15 February 2014, Salam announced a national unity government. It was made up of twenty-four ministers, including one woman.

== December 2016 cabinet ==
The December 2016 cabinet was formed by prime minister Saad Harriri, appointed by President Michel Aoun. The government was the first in the President's term. It was considered resigned in May 2018 after the parliamentary elections.

== January 2019 cabinet ==
The January 2019 cabinet was formed by prime minister Saad Harriri, re-appointed by President Michel Aoun following the May 2018 parliamentary elections. The government took nine months to form, as the prime minister has to reconcile various political factions in a national unity government.'

== January 2020 cabinet ==
The January 2020 cabinet was formed by prime minister Hassan Diab, appointed by President Michel Aoun in reaction to the resignation of Prime Minister Saad Hariri on 29 October 2019. See also 2019-2020 Lebanese protests.

== September 2021 cabinet ==
A new government was formed by Najib Mikati on 10 September 2021 after a 13-month-long wait for a new cabinet.
