= Luis Viceira =

American economist

Luis M. Viceira is a Spanish/American economist currently the George E. Bates Professor at Harvard Business School. He graduated from Autonomous University of Madrid and Harvard University (MA and PhD in economics).
