= Center for Research on Computation and Society =

Research center at Harvard University

Coordinates: 42.37955°N 71.11957°W

- Formation: 2005
- Type: Technology social computing
- Location: Harvard University, Cambridge, Massachusetts, United States
- Leader: Milind Tambe
- Website: crcs.seas.harvard.edu

The Center for Research on Computation and Society (CRCS, commonly pronounced "circus") is a research center at Harvard University that focuses on interdisciplinary research combining computer science with social sciences. It is based in Harvard John A. Paulson School of Engineering and Applied Sciences. It is currently directed by Milind Tambe.

== History ==
The center was officially founded in 2005, although there are appearances of CRCS affiliation back in 1996. The center name mimics the name of the centers for Internet and Society such as Stanford's or Harvard's.The Privacy Tools Project was one of the most important efforts led by CRCS. It received funding from multiple sources from 2009 throughout 2020 in order to research and build tools to enhance privacy, in a common effort with Harvard's Berkman Klein Center, Harvard's Data Privacy Lab, and MIT Libraries. The CRCS founding director was Stuart M. Shieber. After him, the center was directed by Greg Morrisett and later by Salil Vadhan until 2015, when Margo Seltzer was named new director. In 2018, after her departure to Columbia University, she was replaced as director by Jim Waldo. When Milind Tambe joined Harvard in September 2019 he became the new center director.

The center has a yearly fellowship program, and relevant past fellows include Simson Garfinkel or Ariel Procaccia. It also hosts regular public talks ("seminars") with distinguished invited speakers, which are usually video recorded. Some speakers include Susan Crawford, Bruce Schneier or Megan Price.

== Research ==
The center has covered a broad spectrum of research lines within computer science, typically with social aspects. These include social computing, privacy-enhancing technologies, encryption and data security, misinformation, machine learning fairness, internet of things, or a citizen-science platform.

== See also ==
- Berkman Klein Center for Internet and Society
