= American University of Science and Technology =

University in Beirut, Lebanon

Coordinates: 33°53′4″N 35°31′21″E

- الجامعة الأميركية للعلوم والتكنولوجيا
- Former names: American Universal College (1989–2000)
- Motto: Commitment to Excellence (English); Commitment est ad virtutem (Latin)
- Type: Private
- Established: 1989
- Academic affiliations: EVALAG
- President: Hiam Sakr
- Provost: Nabil Haidar
- Students: 5,522.5 (5,098 undergraduate, 414 graduate)
- Location: Beirut, Bhamdoun, Sidon, and Zahlé in Lebanon
- Campus: Urban
- Student newspaper: AUST MidWeek
- Colors: Blue and white
- Website: www.aust.edu.lb

The American University of Science and Technology (AUST; Arabic: الجامعة الأميركية للعلوم والتكنولوجيا) is a private, non-sectarian, and co-educational American university in Lebanon.

The university was established in 1989 in Beirut, under the name American Universal College, by Decree No. 4897 as an External Degree Program of the State University of New York's Empire State College. In 2000, it became a private, non-sectarian, and co-educational institution of higher learning licensed by the Lebanese Presidential Decree No. 3585. In 2007, it was licensed as "The American University of Science and Technology" by the Lebanese Governmental Decree No. 677.

AUST offers programs and degrees for business, economics, art, engineering, and sciences, including health sciences. As of March 2019, it has four campuses located in Beirut, Aley, Sidon, and Zahlé. With the establishment of a French-speaking department, the university promotes trilingualism in English, French, and Arabic, and fosters a corresponding cultural environment.

== History ==
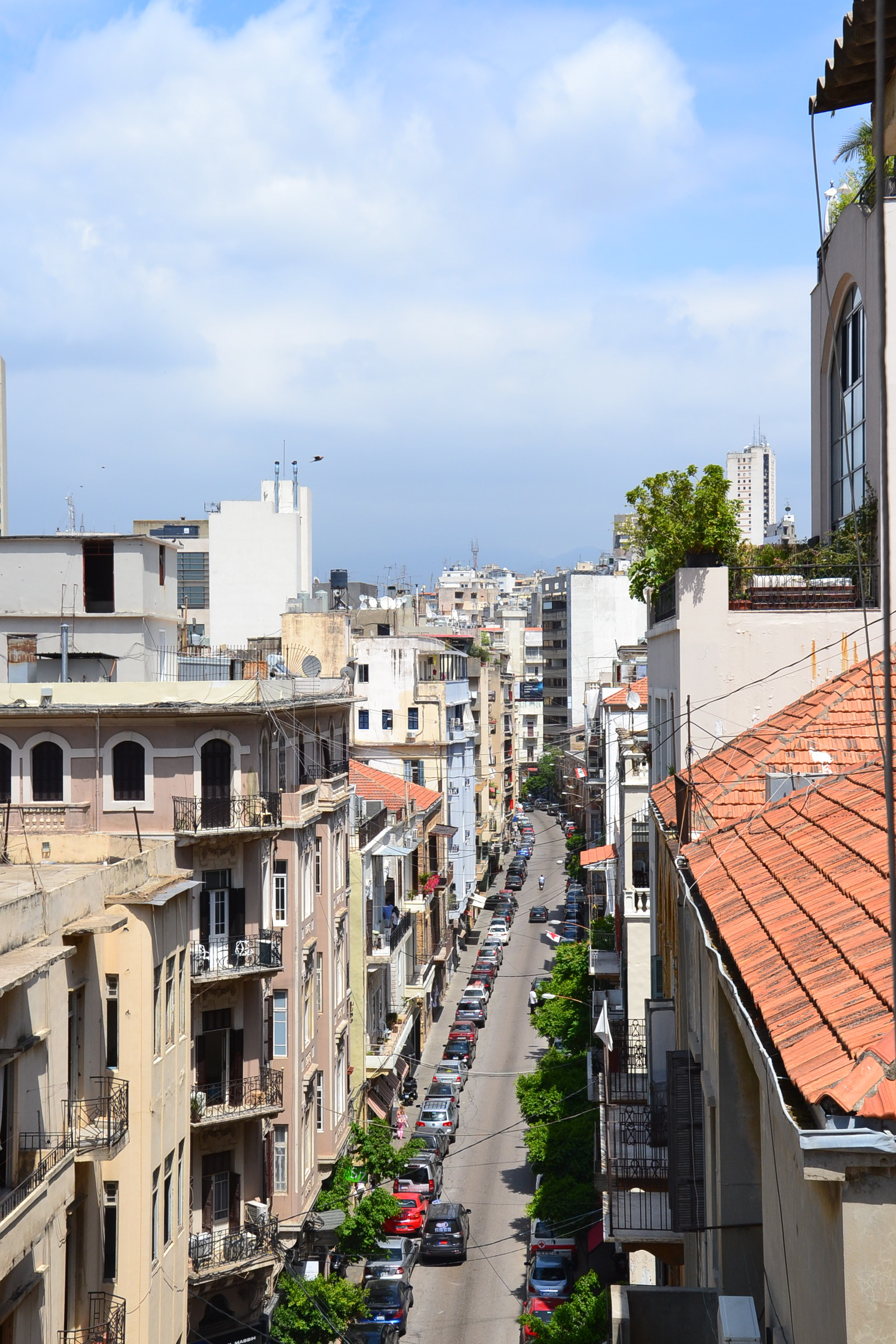
AUST was founded in 1989 in Beirut, Lebanon.

The American University of Science and Technology was founded in 1989 as an external degree program of the State University of New York through its School for Graduate Studies, Empire State College. It was founded through Decree No. 4897 under the name American Universal College by Dr. Hiam Sakr on Alfred Naccache Street in Beirut. The institution changed its name to the American University of Science and Technology on March 21, 1994. On August 7, 2000, it became a private, non-sectarian, and co-educational institution of higher learning licensed by the Lebanese Presidential Decree Number 3585. In 2007, the institute was licensed as a university by Lebanese Governmental Decree Number 677. Boutros Harb was elected head of the board of directors of the university.

The university offers both undergraduate and graduate courses and degrees in most departments. It offers instruction in both English and French.

== Campus ==
The American University of Science and Technology has four campuses across Lebanon. The Main campus is located in the Ashrafieh area of Beirut, Lebanon. The Zahlé campus is located on Mouallaka Avenue in Bekaa, East Lebanon. The Sidon campus is located at Sidon's northern entrance, Nazih Bizri Boulevard, South Lebanon. The Bhamdoun campus is located in Mount Lebanon.

=== Garden of Genius ===
On October 11, 2010, the university held a commemorative ceremony, during which poet Said Akl unveiled his statue "Garden of Genius" at the university campus in Beirut. The event was held in the presence of many dignitaries, literary figures, religious leaders, politicians, and diplomats.

"Said Akl's original patriotism,
as well as his endless loyalty
to his beloved Lebanon,
was what made him."

— President Hiam Sakr

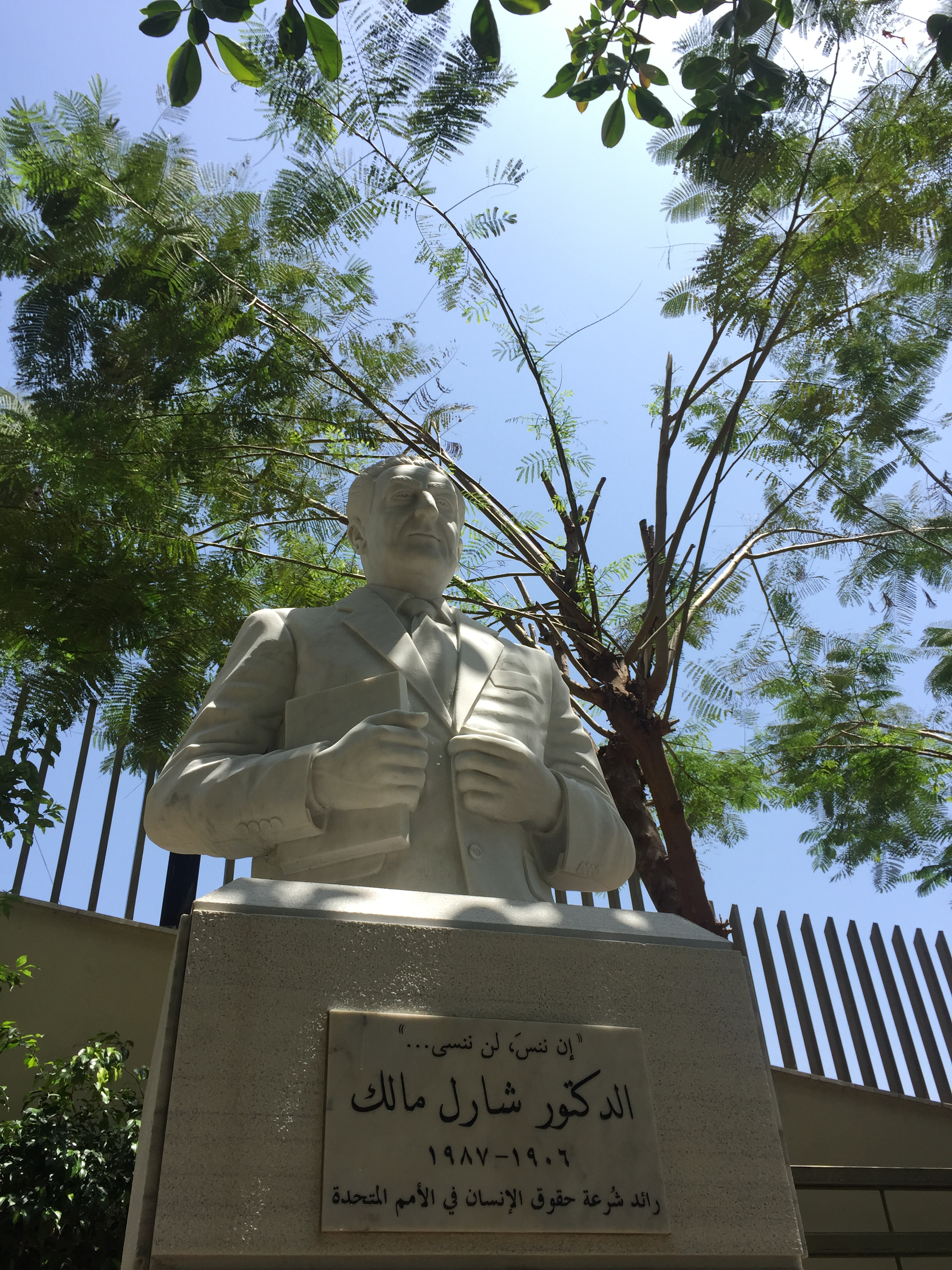
Charles Malik's university statue

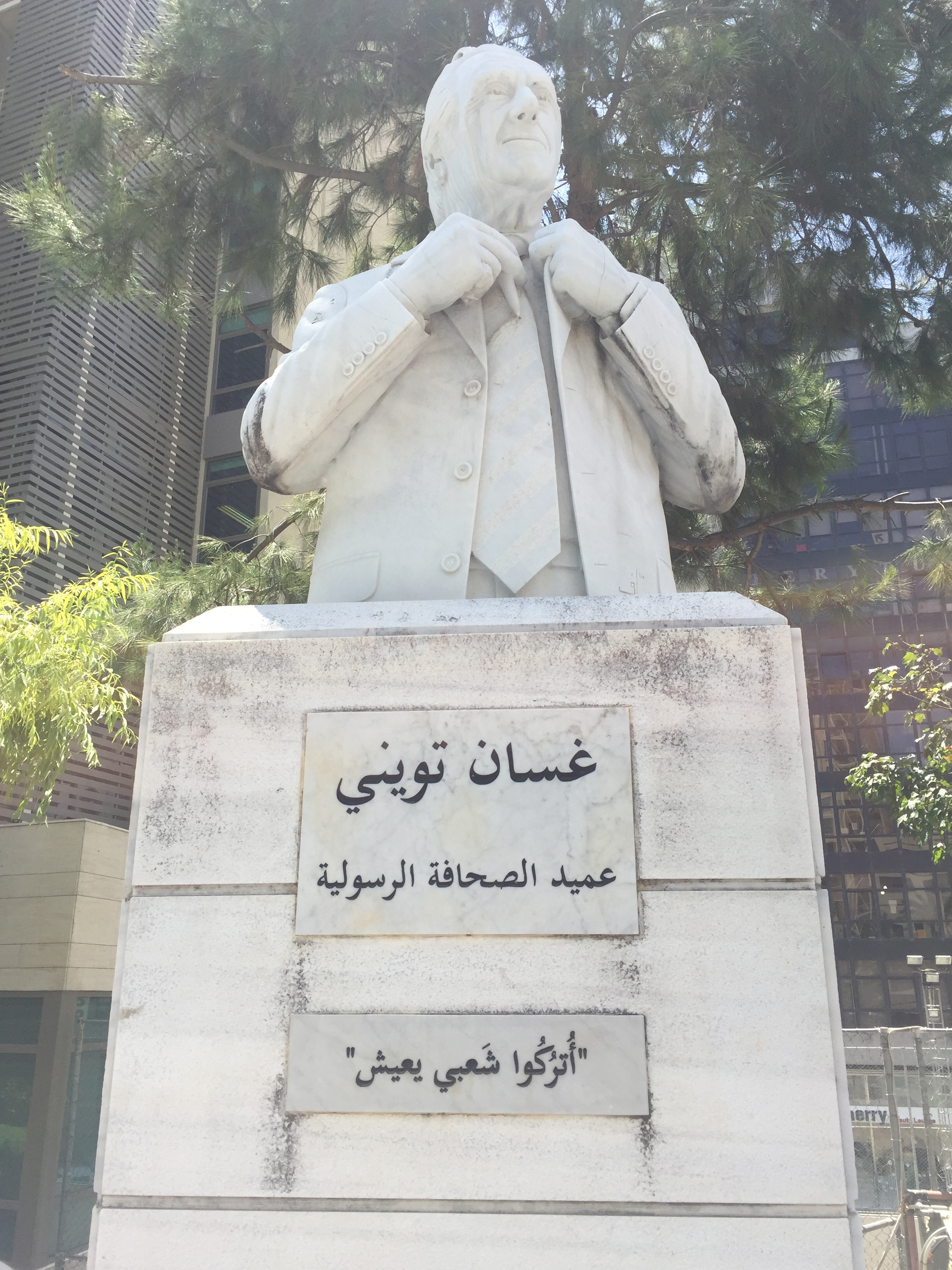
Ghassan Tueni's university statue

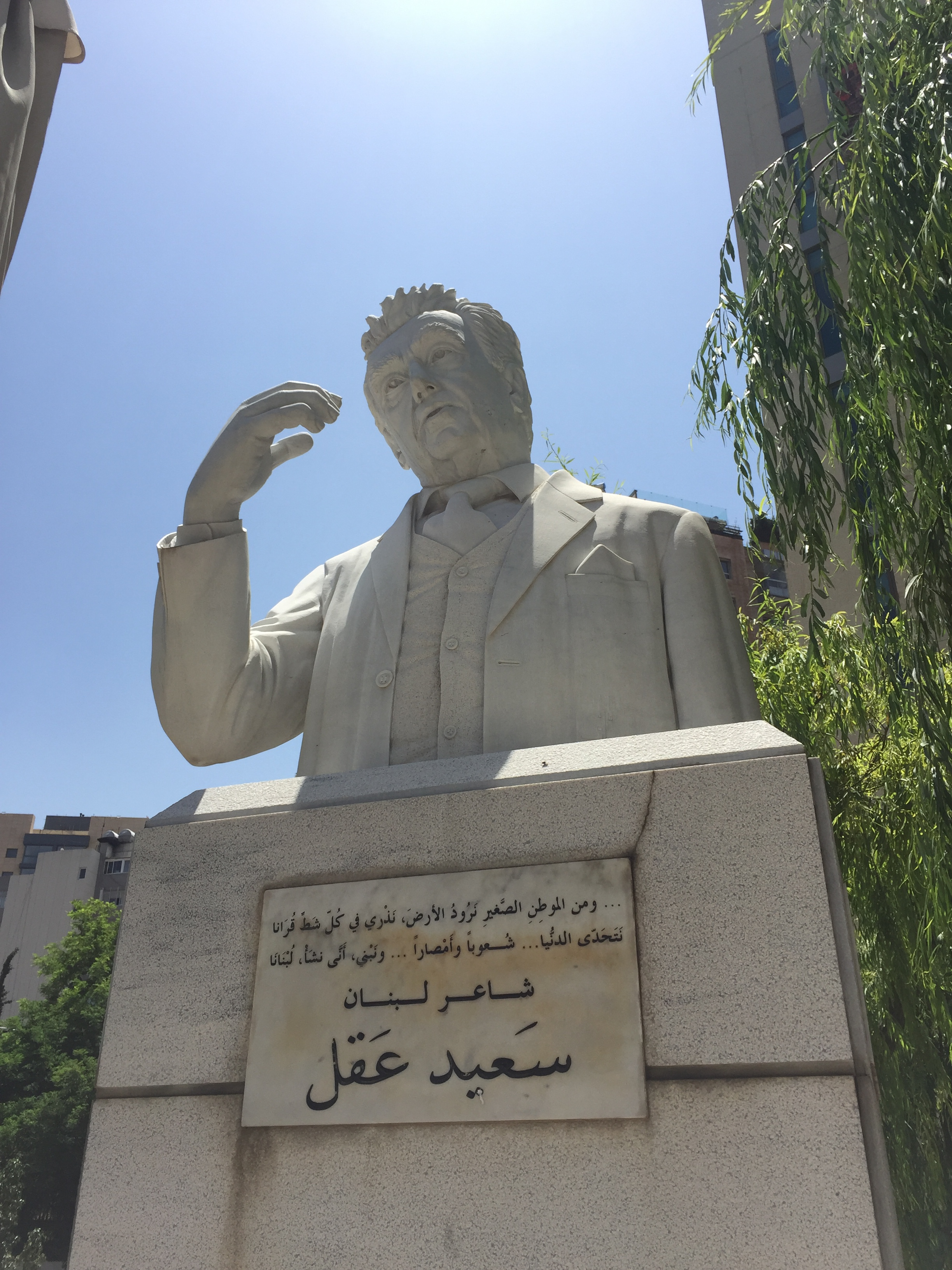
Said Akl's university statue

== Faculties ==
As of March 31, 2011, the Faculty of Business and Economics received the accreditation of the International Assembly for Collegiate Business Education for its business programs: Master of Business Administration (MBA) and Bachelor's degree of Science in Business Administration.

On September 7, 2016, the Faculty of Science received the accreditation of the Accreditation Board for Engineering and Technology, Inc (ABET) for its Engineering and Computer Science programs.

=== Faculty of Arts and Sciences ===
The faculty of arts and sciences consists of seven academic departments. These include fashion design, interior design, and graphic design.

=== Faculty of Business and Economics ===
The faculty of business and economics offers programs leading to a bachelor's degree in the following fields of specialization: accounting, economics, finance, hospitality management, management, management information systems, marketing, travel and tourism management, and marketing and advertising. In addition, the Faculty offers a graduate program leading to the Master of Business Administration (MBA) with the following fields of concentration: accounting, economics, finance, management, hospitality management, management information systems, and marketing.

=== Faculty of Health Sciences ===
AUST has also decided to participate in the development and increase of biotechnology in Lebanon and the Middle East region by creating the Department of Laboratory Science and Technology. The department offers two biotechnology tracks: the Clinical Laboratory Science and Optics and Optometry. In both tracks, the student will enroll in a BS program followed by an optional year of a specialty program.

=== Faculty of Engineering ===
The faculty of engineering offers programs in Biomedical Engineering, Computer & Communications Engineering, and Mechatronics Engineering. They plan to collaborate with national and international academic institutions and companies in its pursuit of excellence. It works with the EAC ABET Committee.

== Accreditation and Affiliations ==
The university has more than 33 affiliations with other universities. These affiliations enable their students to transfer credits, follow similar academic curriculums, and ensure consistent technical training standards. In 2018, AUST received an institutional accreditation from Evalag (Evaluation Agency of Baden-Württemberg), a member of the European Association for Quality Assurance in Higher Education. The university's affiliations include:

North America

- United States: University of North Carolina (Established 1789 in North Carolina)
- United States: Ohio University (Established 1804 in Ohio)
- United States: Villanova University (Established 1842 in Pennsylvania)
- United States: University of Kentucky (Established 1865 in Kentucky)
- United States: University of California (Established 1868 in California)
- United States: University of California, Berkeley (Established 1868 in California)
- United States: University of Arkansas (Established 1871 in Arkansas)
- United States: New Jersey Institute of Technology (Established 1881 in New Jersey)
- United States: Keuka College (Established 1890 in New York)
- United States: American Hotel and Lodging Association (Established 1910 in Washington, D.C.)
- United States: State University of New York-Empire State College (Established 1971 in New York)
- Canada: École Polytechnique de Montréal (Established 1873 in Montreal)
- Canada: Concordia University (Established 1974 in Montreal)

Europe

Europe

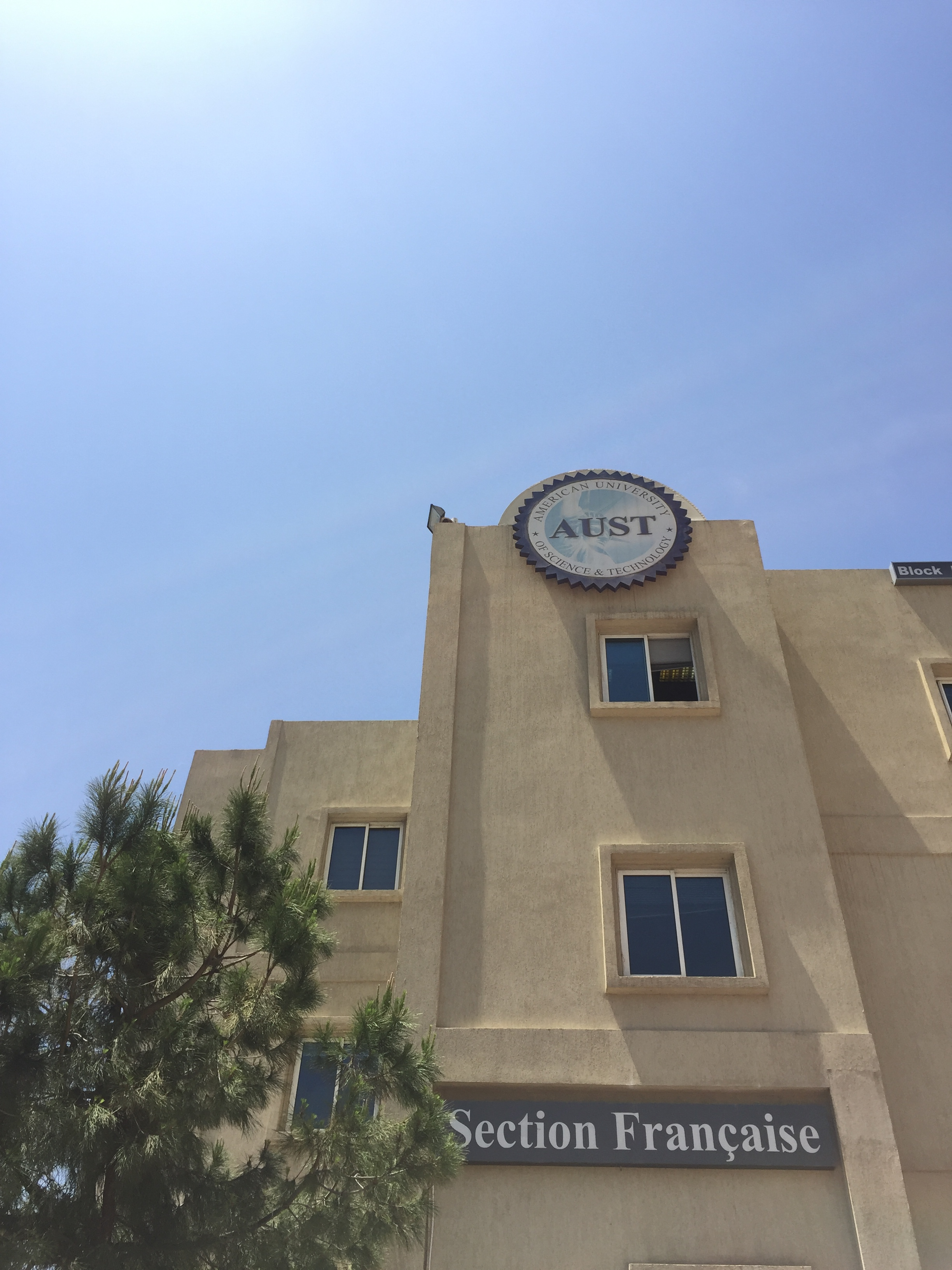
AUST's Section Française in Beirut's campus.

- France: Université Catholique de Lille (Established 1875 in Lille)
- France: École nationale supérieure de création industrielle (Established 1982 in Paris)
- France: Université de Versailles Saint-Quentin-en-Yvelines (Established 1991 in Versailles)
- Switzerland: Unievrsité de Lausanne (Established 1537 in Lausanne)
- Switzerland: César Ritz Colleges Switzerland (Established 1982 in Lucerne)
- Italy: Politecnico di Milano (Established 1863 in Milano)
- Italy: Università degli Studi di Firenze (Established 1321 in Florence)
- Italy: Università Ca' Foscari Venezia (Established 1868 in Venice)
- Italy: Università degli Studi di Urbino "Carlo Bo" (Established 1506 in Urbino)
- Germany: Bremen University of Applied Sciences (Established 1982 in Bremen)
- Germany: Evalag (Evaluationsagentur Baden-Württemberg) (Established 2000 in Baden-Württemberg)
- Spain: Universitat Politècnica de València (Established 1971 in Valencia)
- Bulgaria: The University of Sofia (St. Kliment Ohridski) (Established 1888 in Sofia)
- Poland: Collegium Civitas (Established 1997 in Warsaw)
- Portugal: University of Coimbra (Established 1290 in Coimbra)
- Ukraine: Lviv Polytechnic National University (Established 1844 in Lviv)

Asia

- Lebanon: Lebanese University (Established 1951 in Beirut)
- Jordan: The Hashemite University (Established 1995 in Zarqa)
- China: South China University of Technology (Established 1952 in Guangzhou)

Africa

- Algeria: University of Algiers (Established 1909 in Algiers)
- Egypt: Assiut University (Established 1957 in Assiut)
- Egypt: Tanta University (Established 1972 in Tanta)

== Academics ==
=== Admission ===
Applications for admission to AUST must be submitted before the end of September for admission to the Fall semester, before the end of January for admission to the Spring semester, and before the end of June for admission to the Summer session.

== Student life ==
=== Athletics ===
The AUST sport activities office gives students the opportunity to socialize, organize events, and work in teams.

=== Student clubs ===
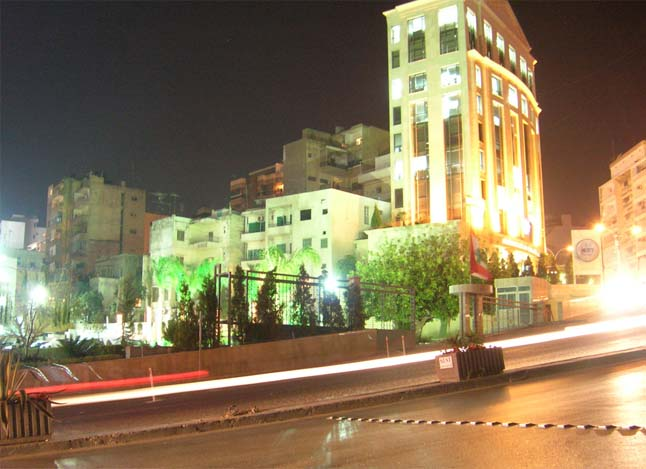
Night View of the university's Bloc B in Beirut.

The Student Life council reviews all requests for student activities by the various student clubs.

The AUST clubs, in 2015, include, but are not limited to the following clubs:

- Environmental Club
- First Aid Club
- Music Club
- Photography Club
- Drama Club
- Chess Club

== Honorary doctorates ==
During each graduation ceremony, the university awards degrees in ad honorem to distinguished personalities for their contributions to a specific field or to society in general. The following is a list of Lebanese, Arab, and international personalities that the American University of Science and Technology has recognized with doctorates:

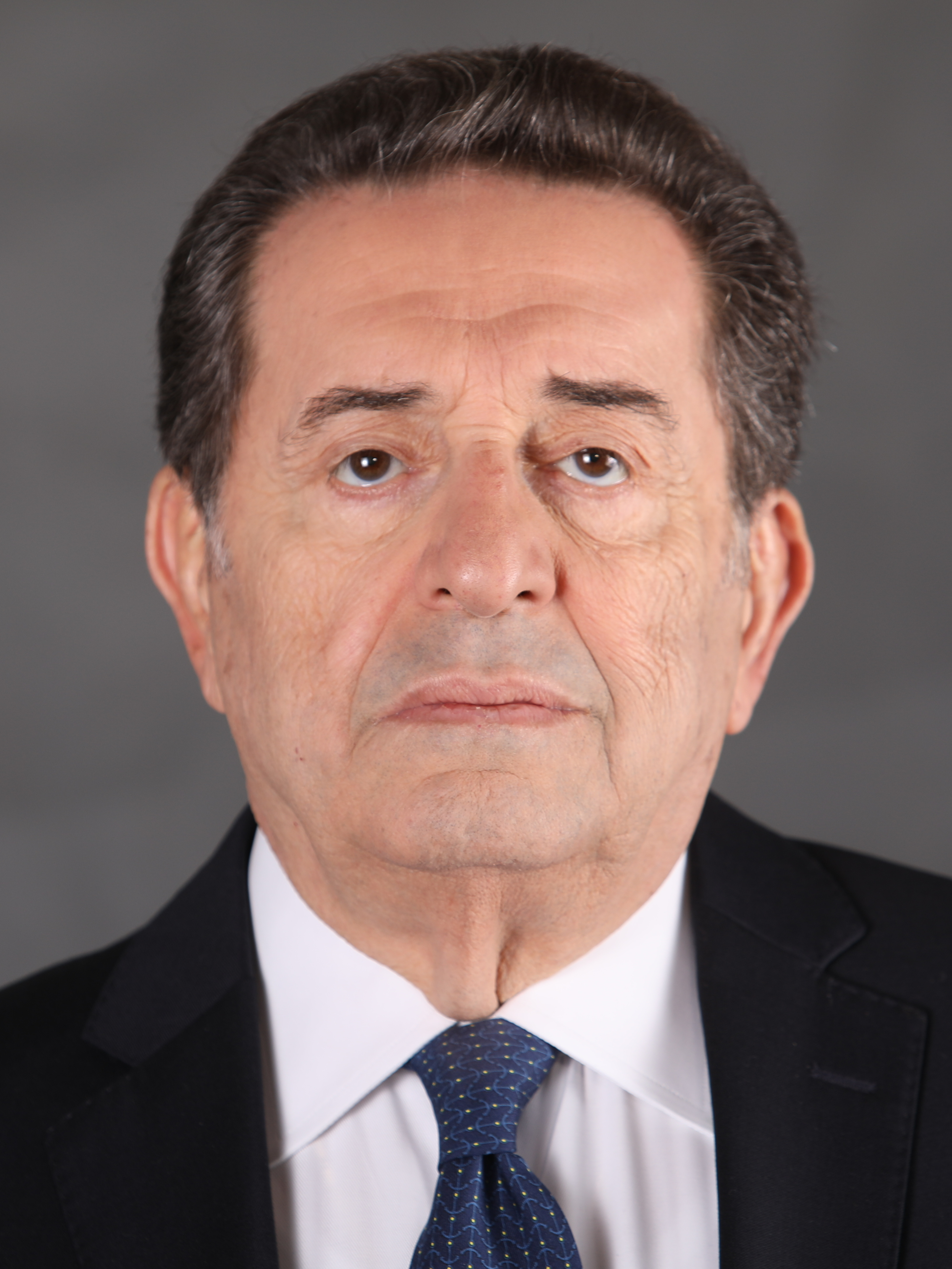
Boutros Harb is the elected head of the board of directors of the AUST.

- Amine Gemayel, (awarded 2019) former president of Lebanon from 1982 to 1988
- Bahia Hariri, (awarded 2010) politician and former minister
- Boutros Harb, (awarded 2017) politician and former minister
- Ghassan Tueni, (awarded 2011) journalist, politician and diplomat who headed An Nahar Newspaper
- Giancarlo Spinelli, (awarded 2017) president of the European Association for International Education
- Hamad Saeed Sultan Al Shamsi, (awarded 2019) United Arab Emirates' Ambassador to Lebanon
- Khalaf Ahmed Al Habtoor, (awarded 2005) chairman of the Al Habtoor Group
- Leila Al Solh, (awarded 2009) vice president of Alwaleed bin Talal Humanitarian Foundation and former minister
- May Chidiac, (awarded 2016) journalist and former minister
- Mouna Elias Hraoui, (awarded 2014) former First Lady of Lebanon
- Rev. Kail C. Ellis, (awarded 2015) assistant to the President of Villanova University
- Saad Hariri(awarded 2018), former Prime Minister of Lebanon
- Salim Georges Sfeir (awarded 2018), banker and financier, chairman and Chief Executive of Bank of Beirut

== Notable alumni ==
American University of Science and Technology's list of notable alumni includes:

- Serena Shim, American journalist. The Serena Shim Award for Uncompromised Integrity in Journalism was launched to honor her.
- Layal Abboud, pop singer, folk music entertainer, sound-lyric poet, concert dancer, fit model, and humanitarian.

== See also ==
- State University of New York
- Empire State College
- American University of Beirut
- American University in Dubai
- American University of Sharjah
- Université Saint-Joseph de Beyrouth
- Achrafieh
- Serena Shim
