= Mik Kersten =

Polish- Canadian computer specialist

- Born: Warsaw, Poland
- Education: University of British Columbia
- Known for: created Task-Focused Interface and Mylyn, major contributor to AspectJ and Aspect-Oriented Programming, Eclipse (software), Flow Framework
- Scientific career
- Fields: Computer Science
- Workplaces: Planview, Tasktop Technologies, Xerox PARC
- Doctoral advisor: Gail C. Murphy

Mik Kersten is a Canadian computer specialist who is the Chief Technology Officer for Planview. He is the author of Project to Product: How to Survive and Thrive in the Age of Digital Disruption with the Flow Framework, a business management book that outlines “a new way of seeing, measuring, and managing software delivery.”

Kersten also created and leads the open-source Eclipse Mylyn project. Kersten invented the Task-Focused Interface technology underlying Mylyn while working on his PhD at the University of British Columbia in Vancouver, British Columbia, Canada. While completing his PhD, Kersten and his PhD supervisor, Gail C. Murphy, founded Tasktop Technologies, which was acquired by Planview.

== Education ==
Kersten graduated from The University of British Columbia with a BSc in Computer Science and Anthropology before continuing his studies and earning an PhD in Computer Science from the same university in 2007.

== Career ==
Kersten started his career as a Research Scientist at Xerox PARC where he built the first aspect-oriented programming environment while working on AspectJ. He then pioneered the integration of development environments with Agile and DevOps tools while working on his Computer Science PhD at the University of British Columbia.

Founding Tasktop Technologies out of that research, Kersten has written over one million lines of open-source code that are still in use today and has brought seven successful open-source and commercial products to market. He is an active member of the Eclipse Foundation, which acts as a steward of the Eclipse open source software development community. Kersten is also on the board of directors and was a founding member of the Open Services for Lifecycle Collaboration (OSLC).

Kersten was named the Chief Technology Officer of Planview, Inc. after Tasktop was acquired by the company. In this role, he leads key innovation initiatives that drive product development for Planview.

== Book and Podcast ==
Kersten’s book, Project to Product: How to Survive and Thrive in the Age of Digital Disruption with the Flow Framework, was published by IT Revolution Press on November 20, 2018. This introduces the Flow Framework™, a new way of seeing, measuring, and managing software delivery. All of Kersten’s royalties from the sales of this book are donated to the P2P scholarship and not-for-profit organizations supporting diversity, women, and minorities in technology.

After the release of his book, Kersten began hosting a podcast, Mik + One: The Official Project to Product Podcast by Dr. Mik Kersten. This includes conversations with industry leaders where they delve into how they deliver value and drive digital transformations in their organizations. The podcast began in January 2020.
