= User interface =

Means by which a user interacts with and controls a machine

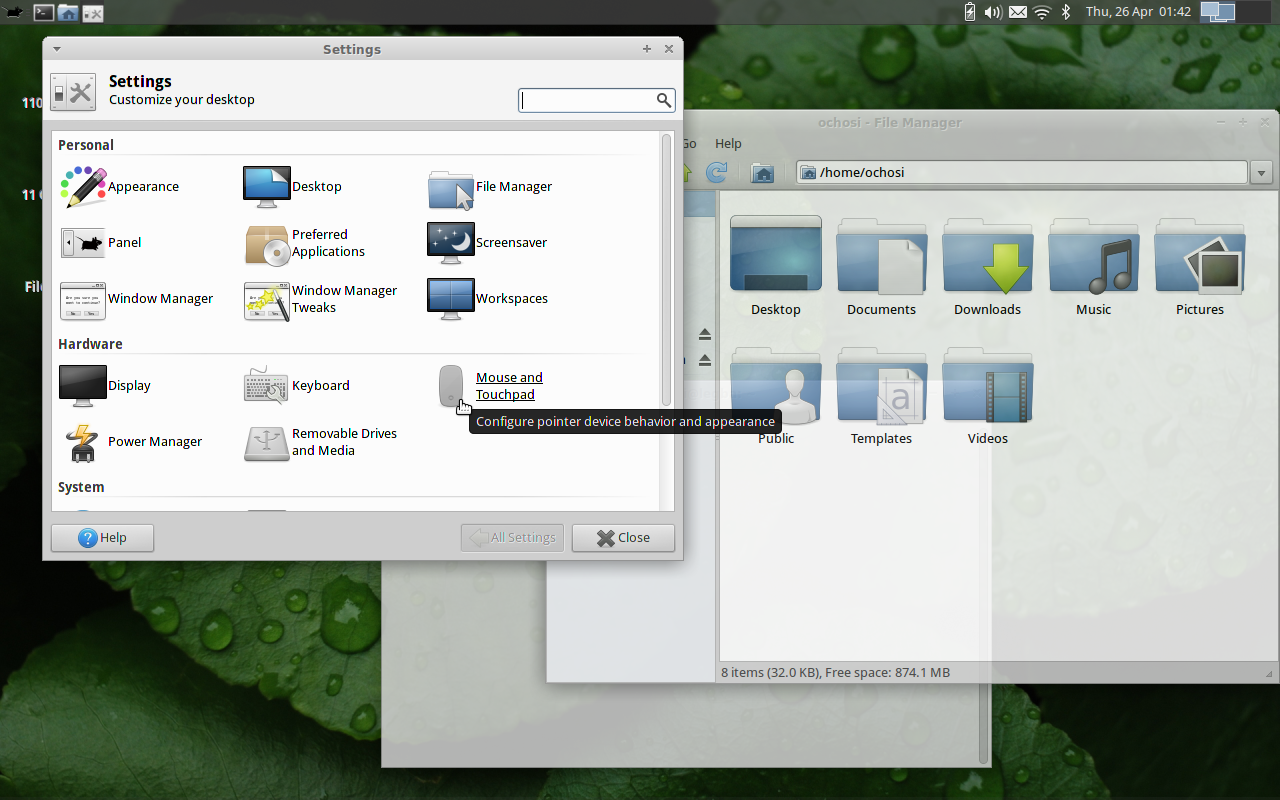
The Xfce desktop environment offers a graphical user interface following the desktop metaphor.

In the industrial design field of human–computer interaction, a user interface (UI) is the space where interactions between humans and machines occur. The goal of this interaction is to allow effective operation and control of the machine from the human end, while the machine simultaneously feeds back information that aids the operators' decision-making process. Examples of this broad concept of user interfaces include the interactive aspects of computer operating systems, hand tools, heavy machinery operator controls and process controls. The design considerations applicable when creating user interfaces are related to, or involve such disciplines as, ergonomics and psychology.

Generally, the goal of user interface design is to produce a user interface that makes it easy, efficient, and enjoyable (user-friendly) to operate a machine in the way which produces the desired result (i.e. maximum usability). This generally means that the operator needs to provide minimal input to achieve the desired output, and also that the machine minimizes undesired outputs to the user.

User interfaces are composed of one or more layers, including a human–machine interface (HMI) that typically interfaces machines with physical input hardware (such as keyboards, mice, or game pads) and output hardware (such as computer monitors, speakers, and printers). A device that implements an HMI is called a human interface device (HID). User interfaces that dispense with the physical movement of body parts as an intermediary step between the brain and the machine use no input or output devices except electrodes alone; they are called brain–computer interfaces (BCIs) or brain–machine interfaces (BMIs).

Other terms for human–machine interfaces are man–machine interface (MMI) and, when the machine in question is a computer, human–computer interface. Additional UI layers may interact with one or more human senses, including: tactile UI (touch), visual UI (sight), auditory UI (sound), olfactory UI (smell), equilibria UI (balance), and gustatory UI (taste).

Composite user interfaces (CUIs) are UIs that interact with two or more senses. The most common CUI is a graphical user interface (GUI), which is composed of a tactile UI and a visual UI capable of displaying graphics. When sound is added to a GUI, it becomes a multimedia user interface (MUI). There are three broad categories of CUI: standard, virtual and augmented. Standard CUI use standard human interface devices like keyboards, mice, and computer monitors. When the CUI blocks out the real world to create a virtual reality, the CUI is virtual and uses a virtual reality interface. When the CUI does not block out the real world and creates augmented reality, the CUI is augmented and uses an augmented reality interface. When a UI interacts with all human senses, it is called a qualia interface, named after the theory of qualia. CUI may also be classified by how many senses they interact with as either an X-sense virtual reality interface or X-sense augmented reality interface, where X is the number of senses interfaced with. For example, a Smell-O-Vision is a 3-sense (3S) Standard CUI with visual display, sound and smells; when virtual reality interfaces interface with smells and touch it is said to be a 4-sense (4S) virtual reality interface; and when augmented reality interfaces interface with smells and touch it is said to be a 4-sense (4S) augmented reality interface.

== Overview ==
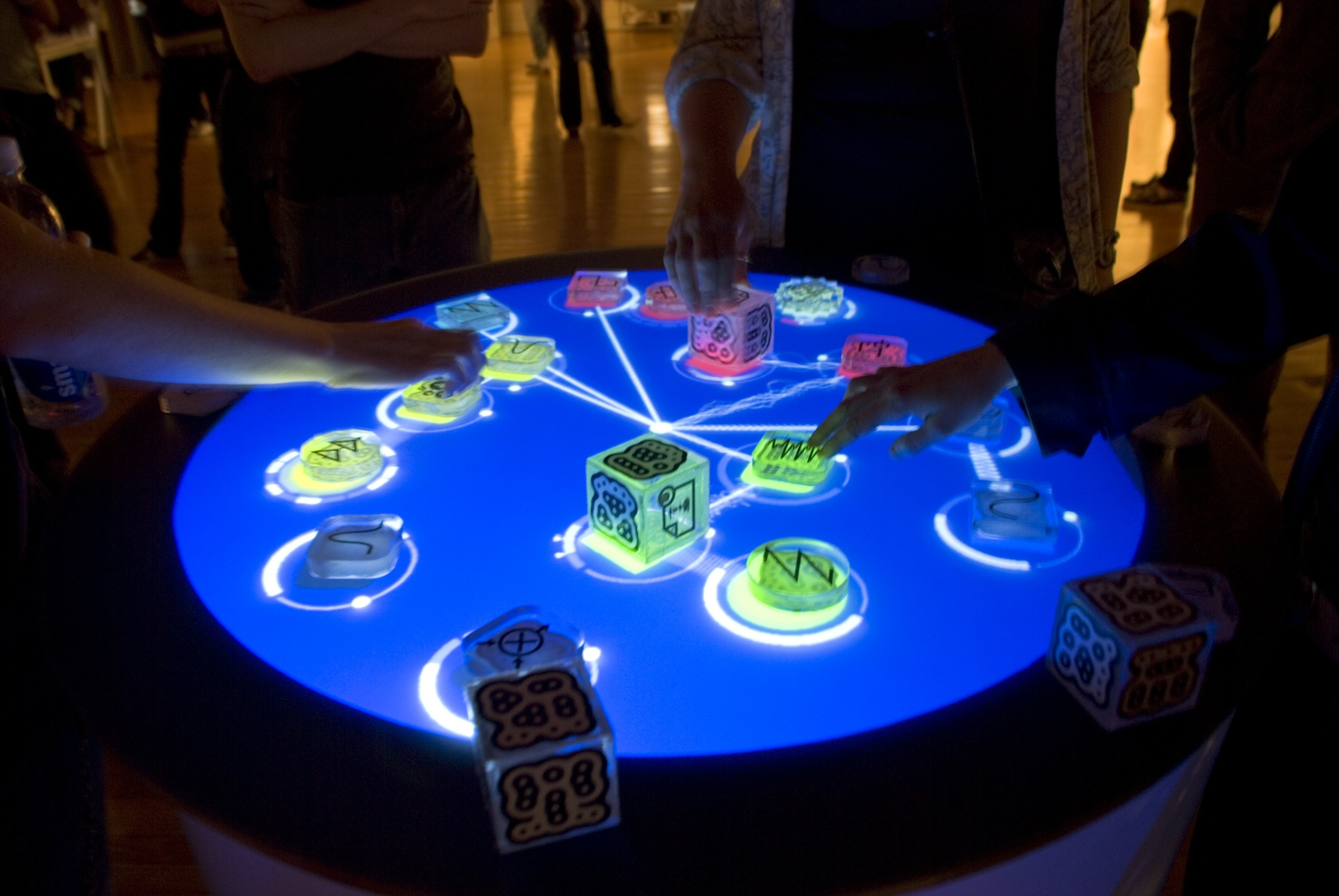
The Reactable musical instrument, an example of a tangible user interface

The user interface or human–machine interface is the part of the machine that handles the human–machine interaction. Membrane switches, rubber keypads and touchscreens are examples of the physical part of the Human Machine Interface which we can see and touch.

In complex systems, the human–machine interface is typically computerized. The term human–computer interface refers to this kind of system. In the context of computing, the term typically extends as well to the software dedicated to control the physical elements used for human–computer interaction.

The engineering of human–machine interfaces is enhanced by considering ergonomics (human factors). The corresponding disciplines are human factors engineering (HFE) and usability engineering (UE) which is part of systems engineering.

Tools used for incorporating human factors in the interface design are developed based on knowledge of computer science, such as computer graphics, operating systems, programming languages. Nowadays, we use the expression graphical user interface for human–machine interface on computers, as nearly all of them are now using graphics.

Multimodal interfaces allow users to interact using more than one modality of user input.

== Terminology ==
A human–machine interface usually involves peripheral hardware for the INPUT and for the OUTPUT. Often, there is an additional component implemented in software, like e.g. a graphical user interface.

There is a difference between a user interface and an operator interface or a human–machine interface (HMI).

- The term "user interface" is often used in the context of (personal) computer systems and electronic devices.
  - Where a network of equipment or computers are interlinked through an MES (Manufacturing Execution System)-or Host to display information.
  - A human–machine interface (HMI) is typically local to one machine or piece of equipment, and is the interface method between the human and the equipment/machine. An operator interface, on the other hand, is the interface method by which multiple pieces of equipment, linked by a host control system, are accessed or controlled.
  - The system may expose several user interfaces to serve different kinds of users. For example, a computerized library database might provide two user interfaces, one for library patrons (limited set of functions, optimized for ease of use) and the other for library personnel (wide set of functions, optimized for efficiency).
- The user interface of a mechanical system, a vehicle or an industrial installation is sometimes referred to as the human–machine interface (HMI). HMI is a modification of the original term MMI (man–machine interface). In practice, the abbreviation MMI is still frequently used although some may claim that MMI stands for something different now. Another abbreviation is HCI, but is more commonly used for human–computer interaction. Other terms used are operator interface console (OIC) and operator interface terminal (OIT). However it is abbreviated, the terms refer to the 'layer' that separates a human that is operating a machine from the machine itself. Without a clean and usable interface, humans would not be able to interact with information systems.

In science fiction, HMI is sometimes used to refer to what is better described as a direct neural interface. However, this latter usage is seeing increasing application in the real-life use of (medical) prostheses—the artificial extension that replaces a missing body part (e.g., cochlear implants).

In some circumstances, computers might observe the user and react according to their actions without specific commands. A means of tracking parts of the body is required, and sensors noting the position of the head, direction of gaze and so on have been used experimentally. This is particularly relevant to immersive interfaces.

== History ==
The history of user interfaces can be divided into the following phases according to the dominant type of user interface:

=== 1945–1968: Batch interface ===
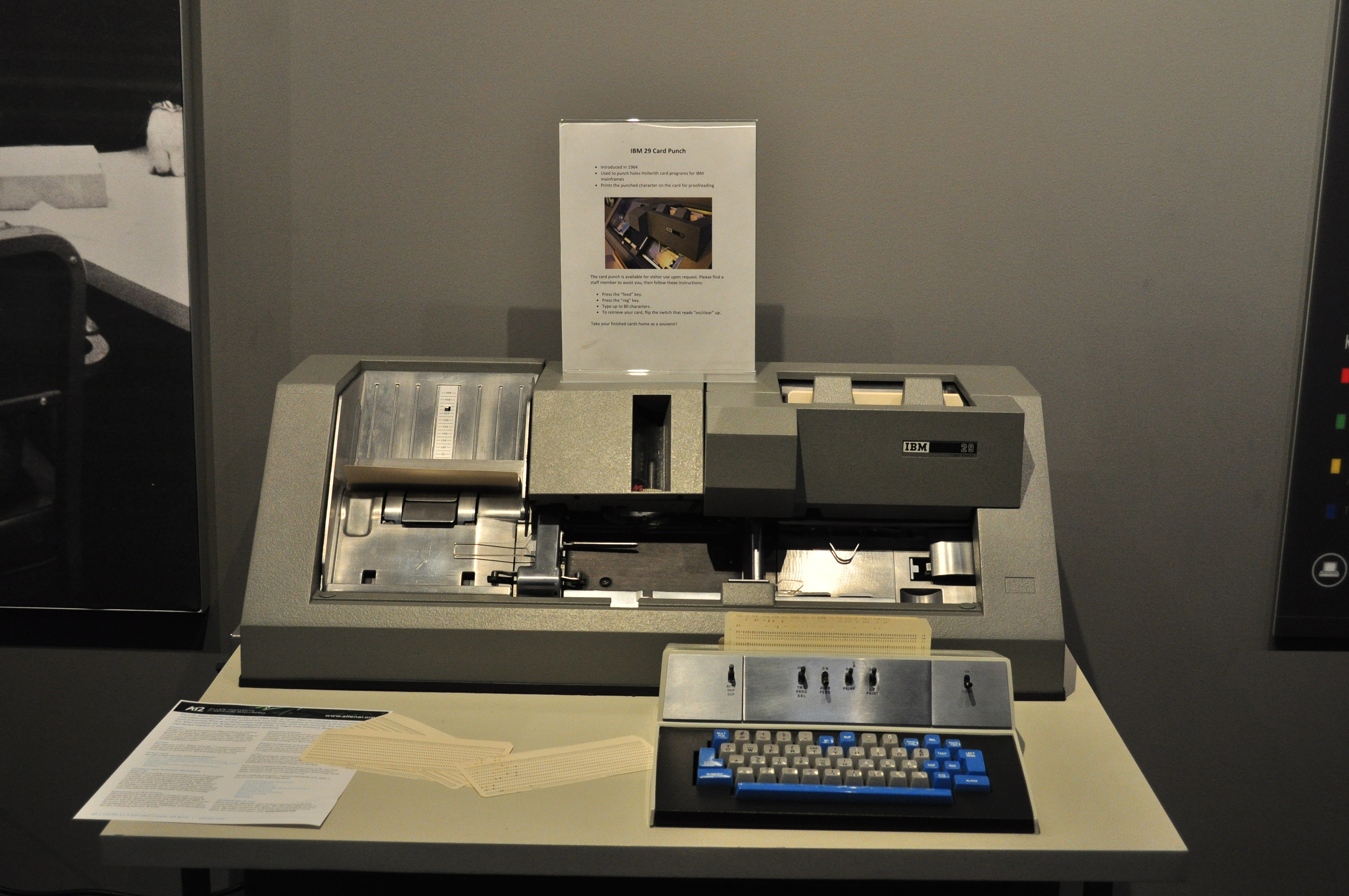
IBM 029

In the batch era, computing power was extremely scarce and expensive. User interfaces were rudimentary. Users had to accommodate computers rather than the other way around; user interfaces were considered overhead, and software was designed to keep the processor at maximum utilization with as little overhead as possible.

The input side of the user interfaces for batch machines was mainly punched cards or equivalent media like paper tape. The output side added line printers to these media. With the limited exception of the system operator's console, human beings did not interact with batch machines in real time at all.

Submitting a job to a batch machine involved first preparing a deck of punched cards that described a program and its dataset. The program cards were not punched on the computer itself but on keypunches, specialized, typewriter-like machines that were notoriously bulky, unforgiving, and prone to mechanical failure. The software interface was similarly unforgiving, with very strict syntaxes designed to be parsed by the smallest possible compilers and interpreters.

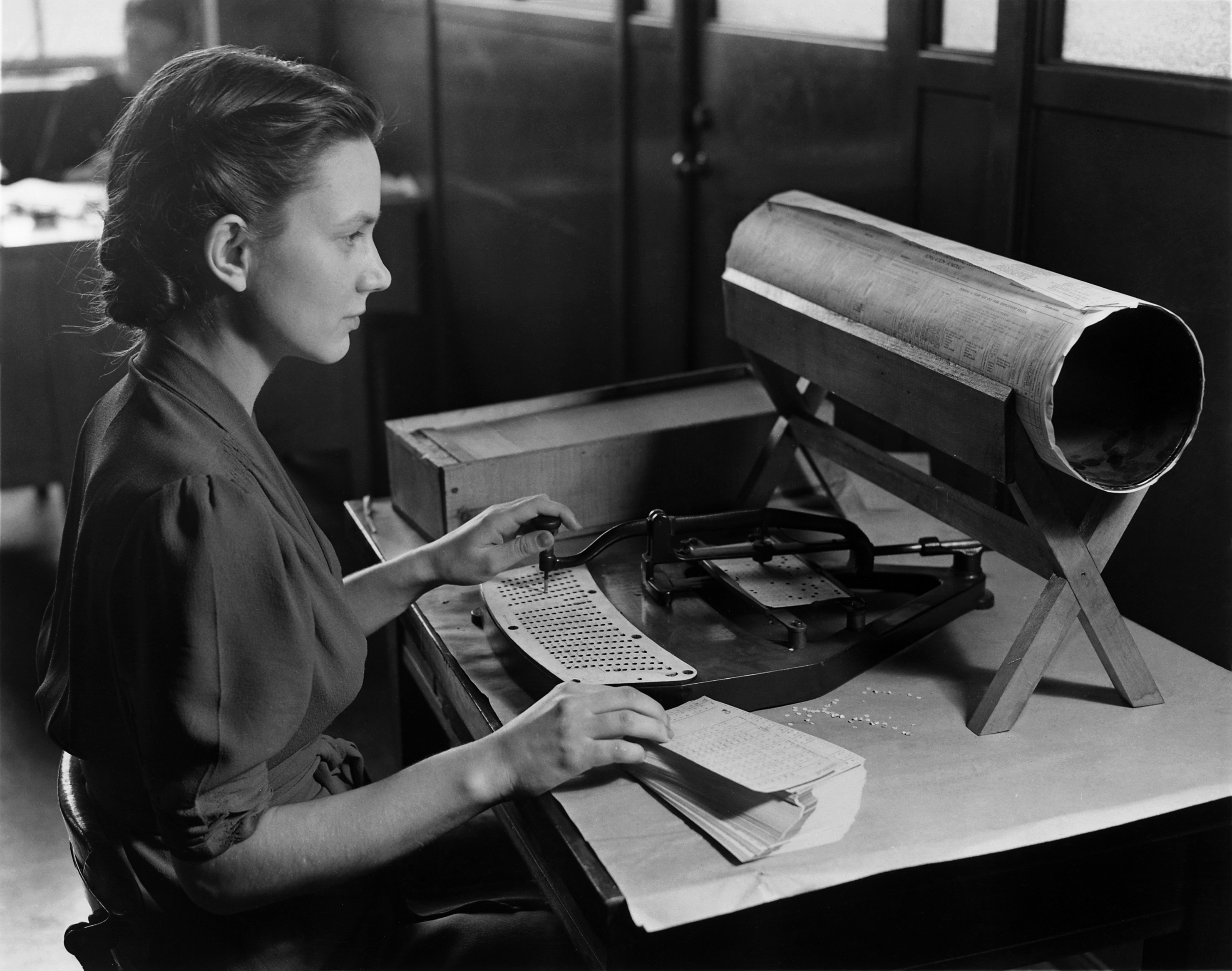
Holes are punched in the card according to a prearranged code transferring the facts from the census questionnaire into statistics.

Once the cards were punched, one would drop them in a job queue and wait. Eventually, operators would feed the deck to the computer, perhaps mounting magnetic tapes to supply another dataset or helper software. The job would generate a printout, containing final results or an abort notice with an attached error log. Successful runs might also write a result on magnetic tape or generate some data cards to be used in a later computation.

The turnaround time for a single job often spanned entire days. If one was very lucky, it might be hours; there was no real-time response. But there were worse fates than the card queue; some computers required an even more tedious and error-prone process of toggling in programs in binary code using console switches. The very earliest machines had to be partly rewired to incorporate program logic into themselves, using devices known as plugboards.

Early batch systems gave the currently running job the entire computer; program decks and tapes had to include what we would now think of as operating system code to talk to I/O devices and do whatever other housekeeping was needed. Midway through the batch period, after 1957, various groups began to experiment with so-called "load-and-go" systems. These used a monitor program which was always resident on the computer. Programs could call the monitor for services. Another function of the monitor was to do better error checking on submitted jobs, catching errors earlier and more intelligently and generating more useful feedback to the users. Thus, monitors represented the first step towards both operating systems and explicitly designed user interfaces.

=== 1969–present: Command-line user interface ===
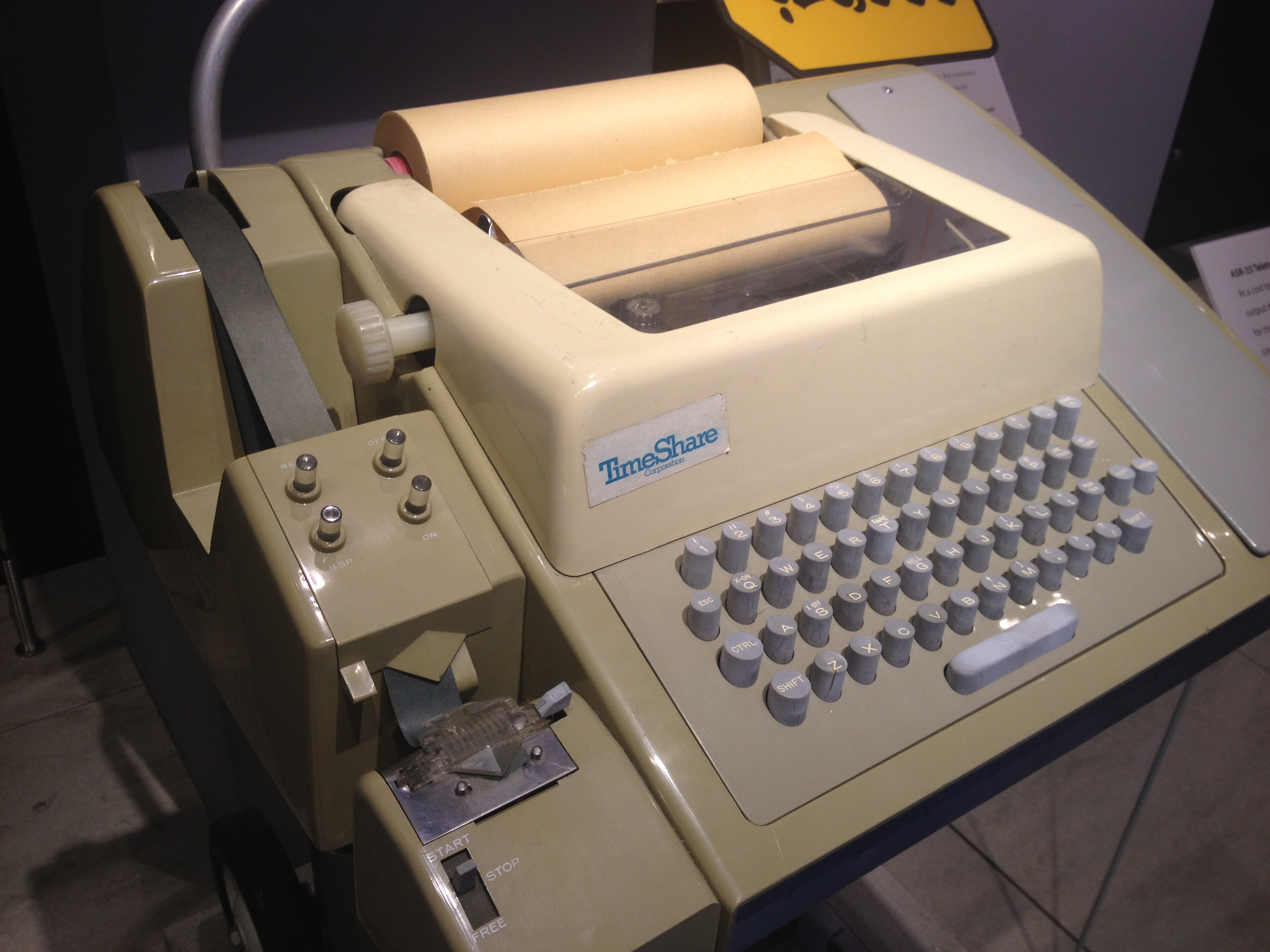
Teletype Model 33 ASR

Command-line interfaces (CLIs) evolved from batch monitors connected to the system console. Their interaction model was a series of request-response transactions, with requests expressed as textual commands in a specialized vocabulary. Latency was far lower than for batch systems, dropping from days or hours to seconds. Accordingly, command-line systems allowed the user to change their mind about later stages of the transaction in response to real-time or near-real-time feedback on earlier results. Software could be exploratory and interactive in ways not possible before. But these interfaces still placed a relatively heavy mnemonic load on the user, requiring a serious investment of effort and learning time to master.

The earliest command-line systems combined teleprinters with computers, adapting a mature technology that had proven effective for mediating the transfer of information over wires between human beings. Teleprinters had originally been invented as devices for automatic telegraph transmission and reception; they had a history going back to 1902 and had already become well-established in newsrooms and elsewhere by 1920. In reusing them, economy was certainly a consideration, but psychology and the rule of least surprise mattered as well; teleprinters provided a point of interface with the system that was familiar to many engineers and users.

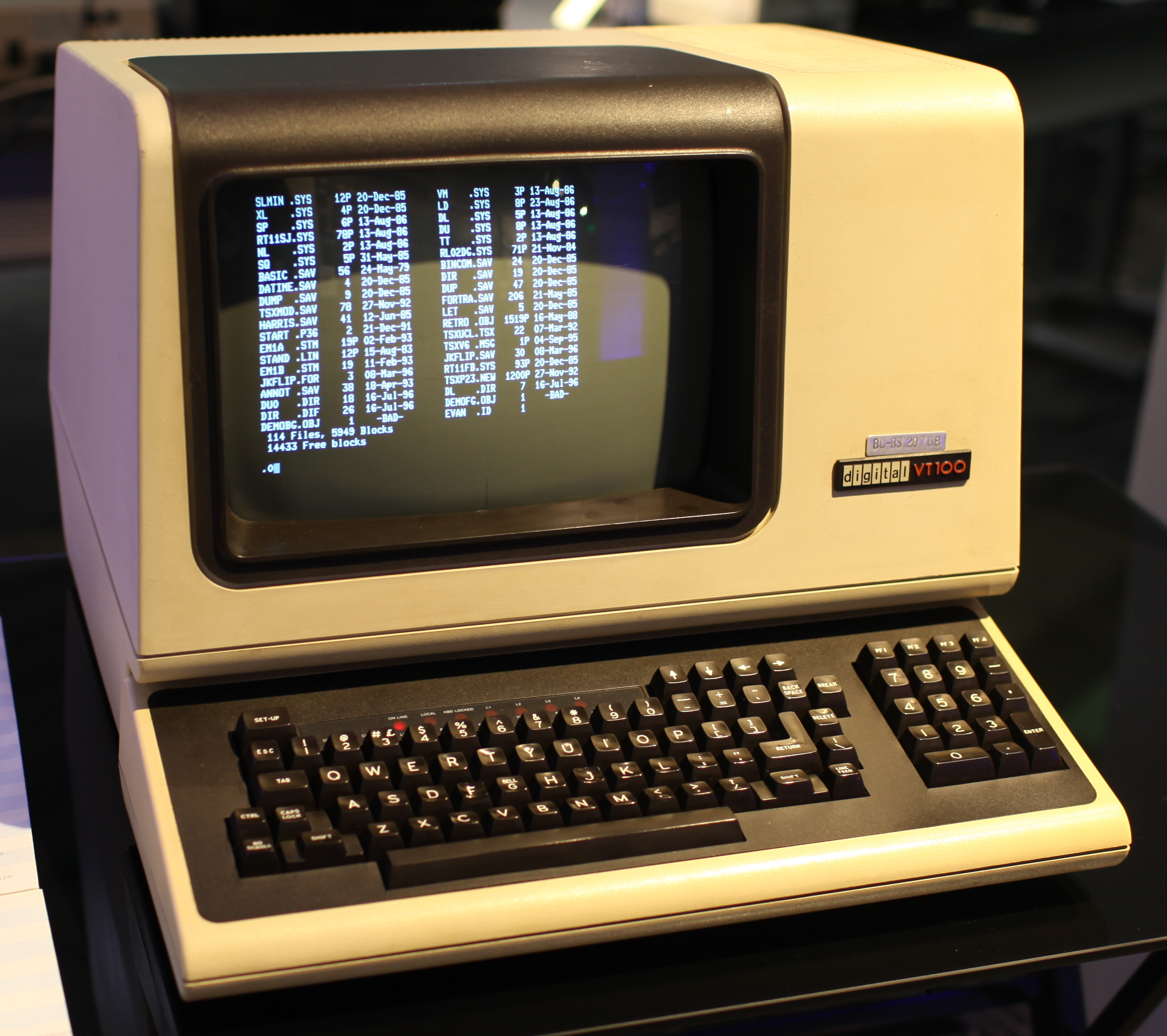
DEC VT100 terminal

The widespread adoption of video-display terminals (VDTs) in the mid-1970s ushered in the second phase of command-line systems. These cut latency further, because characters could be thrown on the phosphor dots of a screen more quickly than a printer head or carriage can move. They helped quell conservative resistance to interactive programming by cutting ink and paper consumables out of the cost picture, and were to the first TV generation of the late 1950s and 60s even more iconic and comfortable than teleprinters had been to the computer pioneers of the 1940s.

Just as importantly, the existence of an accessible screen—a two-dimensional display of text that could be rapidly and reversibly modified—made it economical for software designers to deploy interfaces that could be described as visual rather than textual. The pioneering applications of this kind were computer games and text editors; close descendants of some of the earliest specimens, such as rogue(6), and vi(1), are still a live part of Unix tradition.

=== 1985: SAA user interface or text-based user interface ===
In 1985, with the beginning of Microsoft Windows and other graphical user interfaces, IBM created what is called the Systems Application Architecture (SAA) standard which include the Common User Access (CUA) derivative. CUA successfully created what we know and use today in Windows, and most of the more recent MS-DOS or Windows Console Applications will use that standard as well.

This defined that a pulldown menu system should be at the top of the screen, status bar at the bottom, shortcut keys should stay the same for all common functionality (F2 to Open for example would work in all applications that followed the SAA standard). This greatly helped the speed at which users could learn an application so it caught on quick and became an industry standard.

=== 1968–present: Graphical user interface ===
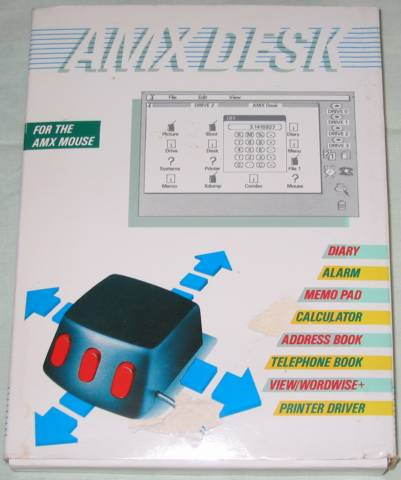
AMX Desk made a basic WIMP GUI.

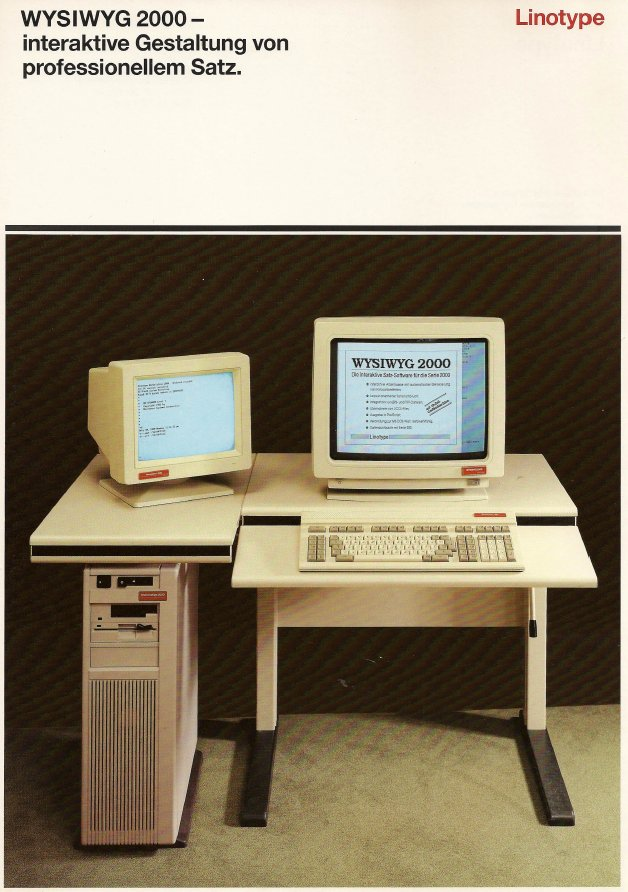
Linotype WYSIWYG 2000, 1989

- 1968 – Douglas Engelbart demonstrated NLS, a system which uses a mouse, pointers, hypertext, and multiple windows.
- 1970 – Researchers at Xerox Palo Alto Research Center (many from SRI) develop WIMP paradigm (Windows, Icons, Menus, Pointers)
- 1973 – Xerox Alto: commercial failure due to expense, poor user interface, and lack of programs
- 1979 – Steve Jobs and other Apple engineers visit Xerox PARC. Though Pirates of Silicon Valley dramatizes the events, Apple had already been working on developing a GUI, such as the Macintosh and Lisa projects, before the visit.
- 1981 – Xerox Star: focus on WYSIWYG. Commercial failure (25K sold) due to cost ($16K each), performance (minutes to save a file, couple of hours to recover from crash), and poor marketing
- 1982 – Rob Pike and others at Bell Labs designed Blit, which was released in 1984 by AT&T and Teletype as DMD 5620 terminal.
- 1984 – Apple Macintosh popularizes the GUI. Super Bowl commercial shown twice, was the most expensive commercial ever made at that time
- 1984 – MIT's X Window System: hardware-independent platform and networking protocol for developing GUIs on UNIX-like systems
- 1985 – Windows 1.0 – provided GUI interface to MS-DOS. No overlapping windows (tiled instead).
- 1985 – Microsoft and IBM start work on OS/2 meant to eventually replace MS-DOS and Windows
- 1986 – Apple threatens to sue Digital Research because their GUI desktop looked too much like Apple's Mac.
- 1987 – Windows 2.0 – Overlapping and resizable windows, keyboard and mouse enhancements
- 1987 – Macintosh II: first full-color Mac
- 1988 – OS/2 1.10 Standard Edition (SE) has GUI written by Microsoft, looks a lot like Windows 2
- Mid-2000s - UIs that used 3D-rendered elements became popular and were used on several operating systems, including Mac OS X and Windows XP/Vista.

== Interface design ==
Primary methods used in the interface design include prototyping and simulation.

Typical human–machine interface design consists of the following stages: interaction specification, interface software specification and prototyping:

- Common practices for interaction specification include user-centered design, persona, activity-oriented design, scenario-based design, and resiliency design.
- Common practices for interface software specification include use cases and constrain enforcement by interaction protocols (intended to avoid use errors).
- Common practices for prototyping are based on libraries of interface elements (controls, decoration, etc.).

=== Principles of quality ===
In broad terms, interfaces generally regarded as user friendly, efficient, intuitive, etc. are typified by one or more particular qualities. For the purpose of example, a non-exhaustive list of such characteristics follows:

1. Clarity: The interface avoids ambiguity by making everything clear through language, flow, hierarchy and metaphors for visual elements.
2. Concision: However ironically, the over-clarification of information—for instance, by labelling the majority, if not the entirety, of items displayed on-screen at once, and regardless of whether or not the user would in fact require a visual indicator of some kind in order to identify a given item—can, and, under most normal circumstances, most likely will lead to the obfuscation of whatever information.
3. Familiarity: Even if someone uses an interface for the first time, certain elements can still be familiar. Real-life metaphors can be used to communicate meaning.
4. Responsiveness: A good interface should not feel sluggish. This means that the interface should provide good feedback to the user about what's happening and whether the user's input is being successfully processed.
5. Consistency: Keeping your interface consistent across your application is important because it allows users to recognize usage patterns.
6. Aesthetics: While you do not need to make an interface attractive for it to do its job, making something look good will make the time your users spend using your application more enjoyable; and happier users can only be a good thing.
7. Efficiency: Time is money, and a great interface should make the user more productive through shortcuts and good design.
8. Forgiveness: A good interface should not punish users for their mistakes but should instead provide the means to remedy them.

=== Principle of least astonishment ===
The principle of least astonishment (POLA) is a general principle in the design of all kinds of interfaces. It is based on the idea that human beings can only pay full attention to one thing at one time, leading to the conclusion that novelty should be minimized.

=== Principle of habit formation ===
If an interface is used persistently, the user will unavoidably develop habits for using the interface. The designer's role can thus be characterized as ensuring the user forms good habits. If the designer is experienced with other interfaces, they will similarly develop habits, and often make unconscious assumptions regarding how the user will interact with the interface.

=== A model of design criteria: User Experience Honeycomb ===
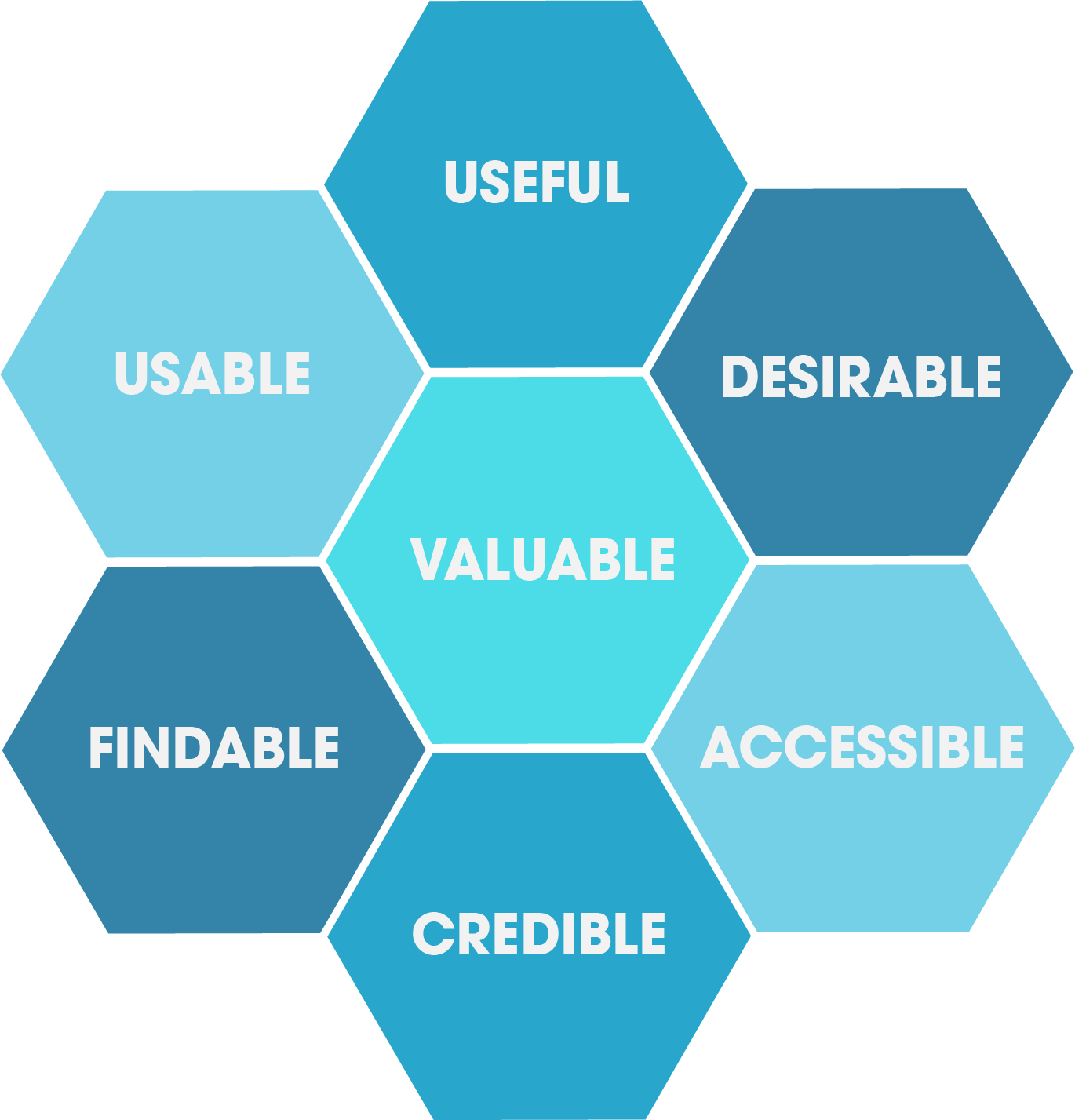
User Experience Design Honeycomb designed by Peter Morville

Peter Morville of Google designed the User Experience Honeycomb framework in 2004 when leading operations in user interface design. The framework was created to guide user interface design. It would act as a guideline for many web development students for a decade.

1. Usable: Is the design of the system easy and simple to use? The application should feel familiar, and it should be easy to use.
2. Useful: Does the application fulfill a need? A business's product or service needs to be useful.
3. Desirable: Is the design of the application sleek and to the point? The aesthetics of the system should be attractive, and easy to translate.
4. Findable: Are users able to quickly find the information they are looking for? Information needs to be findable and simple to navigate. A user should never have to hunt for your product or information.
5. Accessible: Does the application support enlarged text without breaking the framework? An application should be accessible to those with disabilities.
6. Credible: Does the application exhibit trustworthy security and company details? An application should be transparent, secure, and honest.
7. Valuable: Does the end-user think it's valuable? If all 6 criteria are met, the end-user will find value and trust in the application.

== Types ==
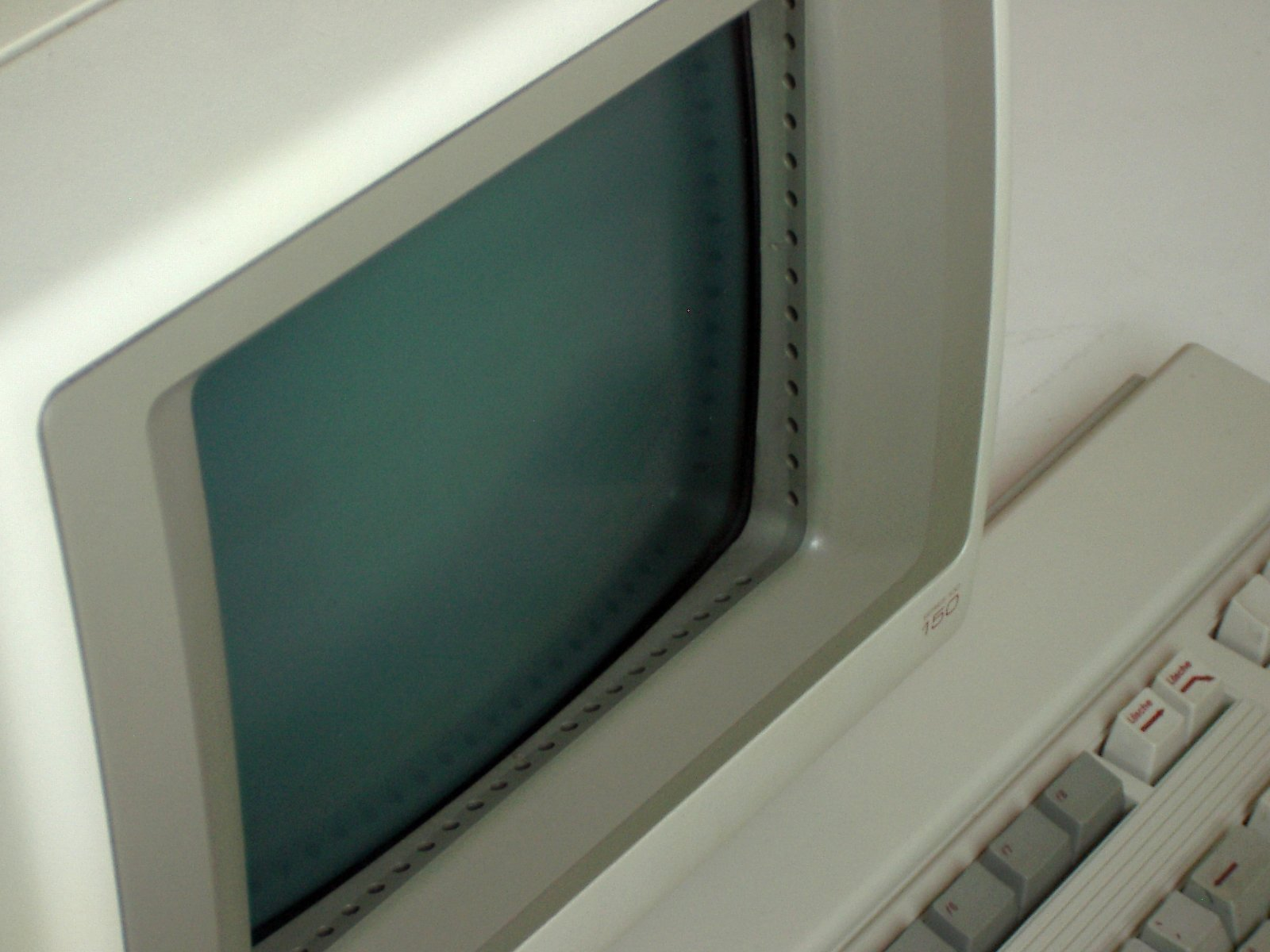
HP Series 100 HP-150 touchscreen

1. Attentive user interfaces manage the user attention deciding when to interrupt the user, the kind of warnings, and the level of detail of the messages presented to the user.
2. Batch interfaces are non-interactive user interfaces, where the user specifies all the details of the batch job in advance to batch processing, and receives the output when all the processing is done. The computer does not prompt for further input after the processing has started.
3. Command line interfaces (CLIs) prompt the user to provide input by typing a command string with the computer keyboard and respond by outputting text to the computer monitor. Used by programmers and system administrators, in engineering and scientific environments, and by technically advanced personal computer users.
4. Conversational interfaces enable users to command the computer with plain text English (e.g., via text messages, or chatbots) or voice commands, instead of graphic elements. These interfaces often emulate human-to-human conversations.
5. Conversational interface agents attempt to personify the computer interface in the form of an animated person, robot, or other character (such as Microsoft's Clippy the paperclip), and present interactions in a conversational form.
6. Crossing-based interfaces are graphical user interfaces in which the primary task consists in crossing boundaries instead of pointing.
7. Direct manipulation interface is a general class of user interfaces that allow users to manipulate objects presented to them, using actions that correspond to the physical world, at least loosely.
8. Gesture interfaces are graphical user interfaces which accept input in a form of hand gestures, or mouse gestures sketched with a computer mouse or a stylus.
9. Graphical user interfaces (GUI) accept input via devices such as a computer keyboard and mouse and provide articulated graphical output on the computer monitor. There are at least two different principles widely used in GUI design: Object-oriented user interfaces (OOUIs) and application-oriented interfaces.
10. Hardware interfaces are the physical, spatial interfaces found on products in the real world from toasters, to car dashboards, to airplane cockpits. They are generally a mixture of knobs, buttons, sliders, switches, and touchscreens.
11. Holographic user interfaces provide input to electronic or electro-mechanical devices by passing a finger through reproduced holographic images of what would otherwise be tactile controls of those devices, floating freely in the air, detected by a wave source and without tactile interaction.
12. Intelligent user interfaces are human–machine interfaces that aim to improve the efficiency, effectiveness, and naturalness of human–machine interaction by representing, reasoning, and acting on models of the user, domain, task, discourse, and media (e.g., graphics, natural language, gesture).
13. Motion tracking interfaces monitor the user's body motions and translate them into commands, some techniques of which were at one point patented by Apple.
14. Multi-screen interfaces, employ multiple displays to provide a more flexible interaction. This is often employed in computer game interaction in both the commercial arcades and more recently the handheld markets.
15. Natural-language interfaces are used for search engines and on webpages. User types in a question and waits for a response.
16. Non-command user interfaces, which observe the user to infer their needs and intentions, without requiring that they formulate explicit commands.
17. Object-oriented user interfaces (OOUI) are based on object-oriented programming metaphors, allowing users to manipulate simulated objects and their properties.
18. Permission-driven user interfaces show or conceal menu options or functions depending on the user's level of permissions. The system is intended to improve the user experience by removing items that are unavailable to the user. A user who sees functions that are unavailable for use may become frustrated. It also provides an enhancement to security by hiding functional items from unauthorized persons.
19. Reflexive user interfaces where the users control and redefine the entire system via the user interface alone, for instance to change its command verbs. Typically, this is only possible with very rich graphic user interfaces.
20. Search interface is how the search box of a site is displayed, as well as the visual representation of the search results.
21. Tangible user interfaces, which place a greater emphasis on touch and physical environment or its element.
22. Task-focused interfaces are user interfaces which address the information overload problem of the desktop metaphor by making tasks, not files, the primary unit of interaction.
23. Text-based user interfaces (TUIs) are user interfaces which interact via text. TUIs include command-line interfaces and text-based WIMP environments.
24. Touchscreens are displays that accept input by touch of fingers or a stylus. Used in a growing amount of mobile devices and many types of point of sale, industrial processes and machines, self-service machines, etc.
25. Touch user interface are graphical user interfaces using a touchpad or touchscreen display as a combined input and output device. They supplement or replace other forms of output with haptic feedback methods. Used in computerized simulators, etc.
26. Voice user interfaces, which accept input and provide output by generating voice prompts. The user input is made by pressing keys or buttons, or responding verbally to the interface.
27. Zero-input interfaces get inputs from a set of sensors instead of querying the user with input dialogs.
28. Zooming user interfaces are graphical user interfaces in which information objects are represented at different levels of scale and detail, and where the user can change the scale of the viewed area in order to show more detail.

== Gallery ==
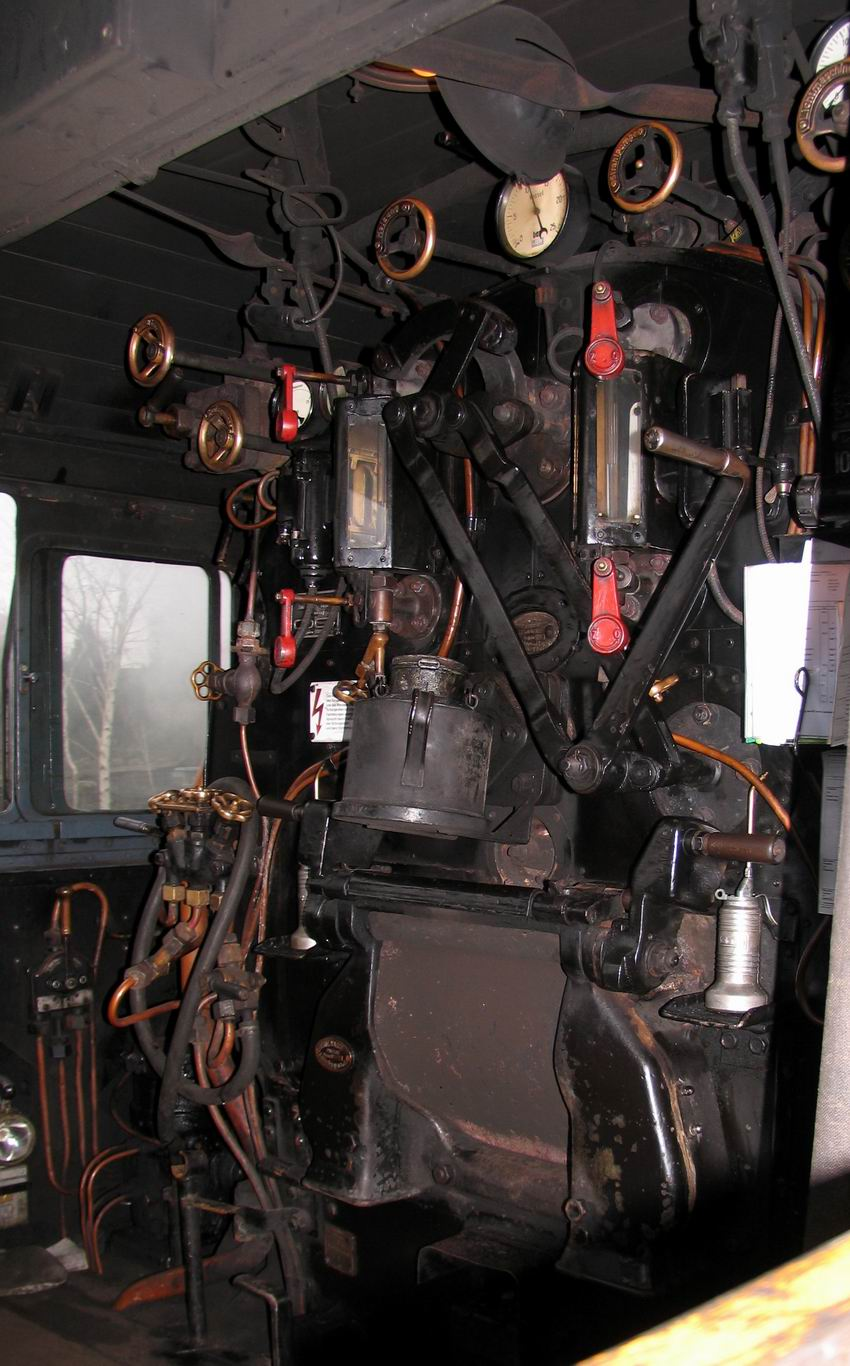
Historic HMI in the driver's cabin of a German steam locomotive

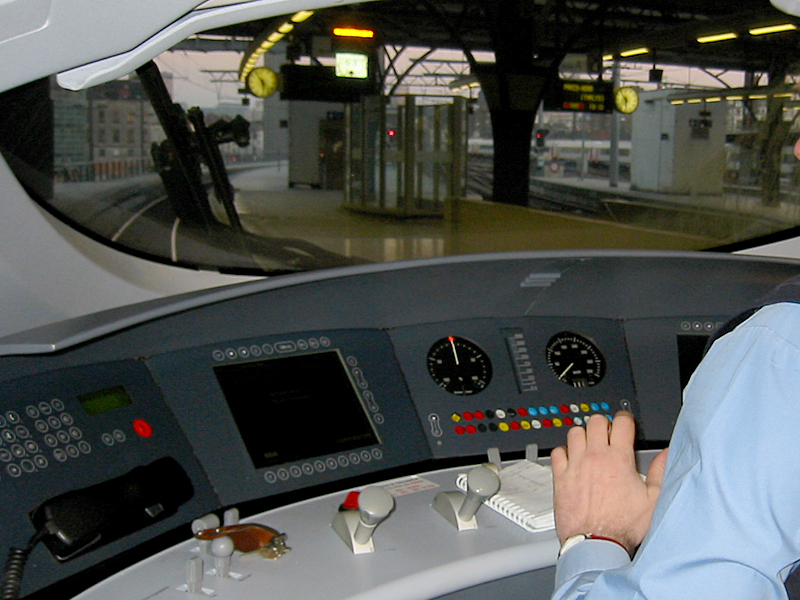
Modern HMI in the driver's cabin of a German Intercity-Express high-speed train

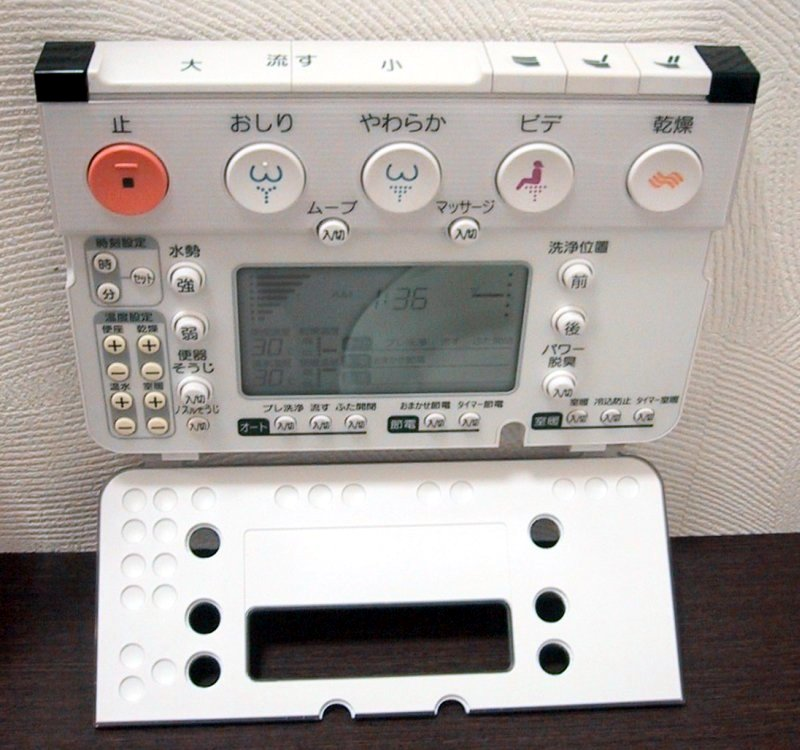
The HMI of a toilette (in Japan)

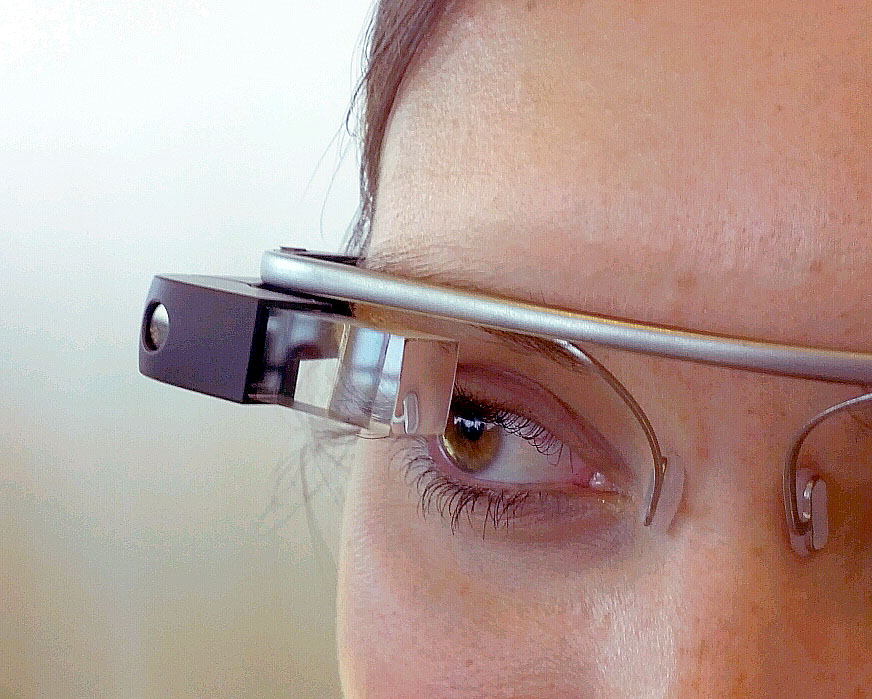
Wearable computers, like Google Glass in the image, may use voice user interface

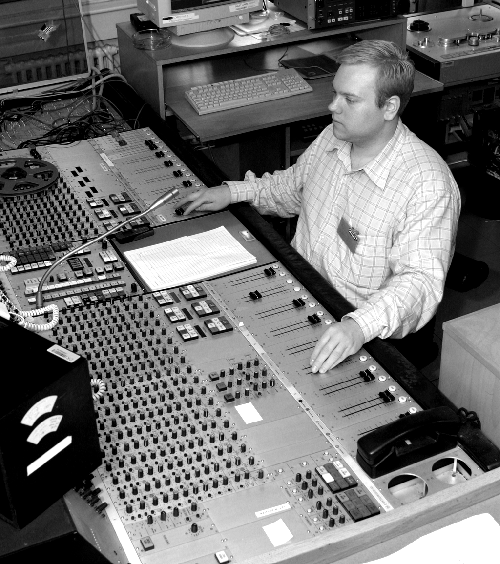
HMI for audio mixing

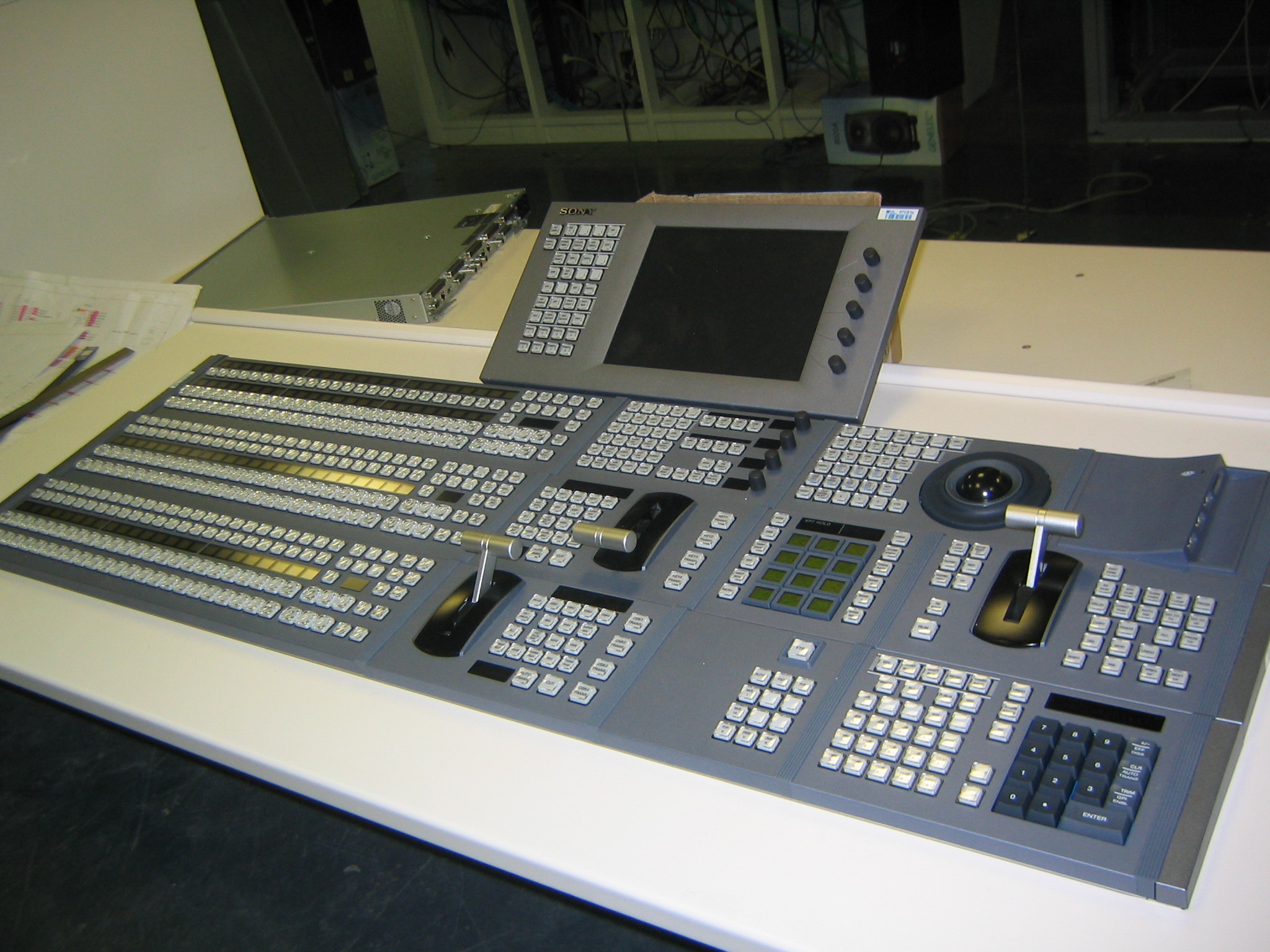
HMI for video production

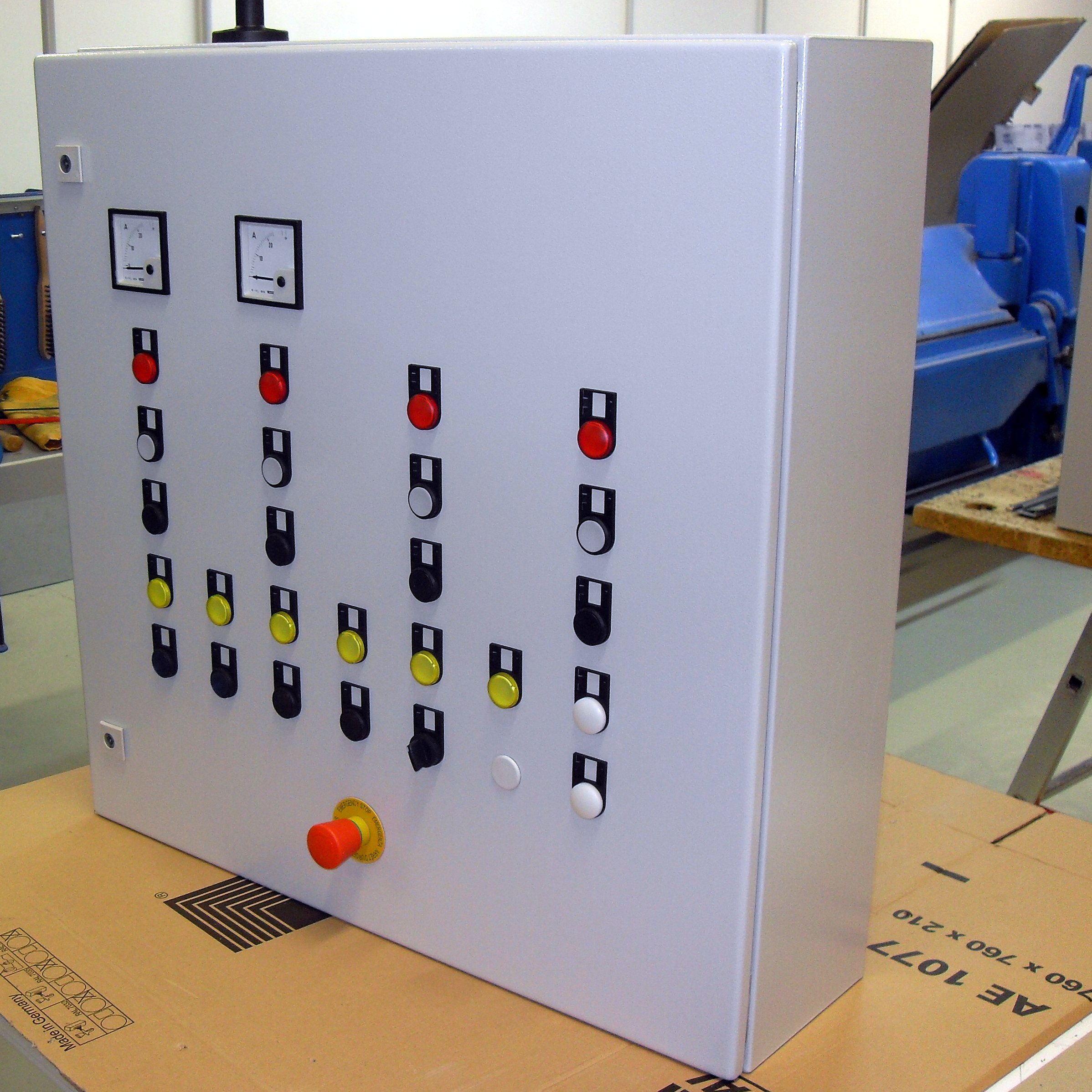
HMI of a machine for the sugar industry with pushbuttons

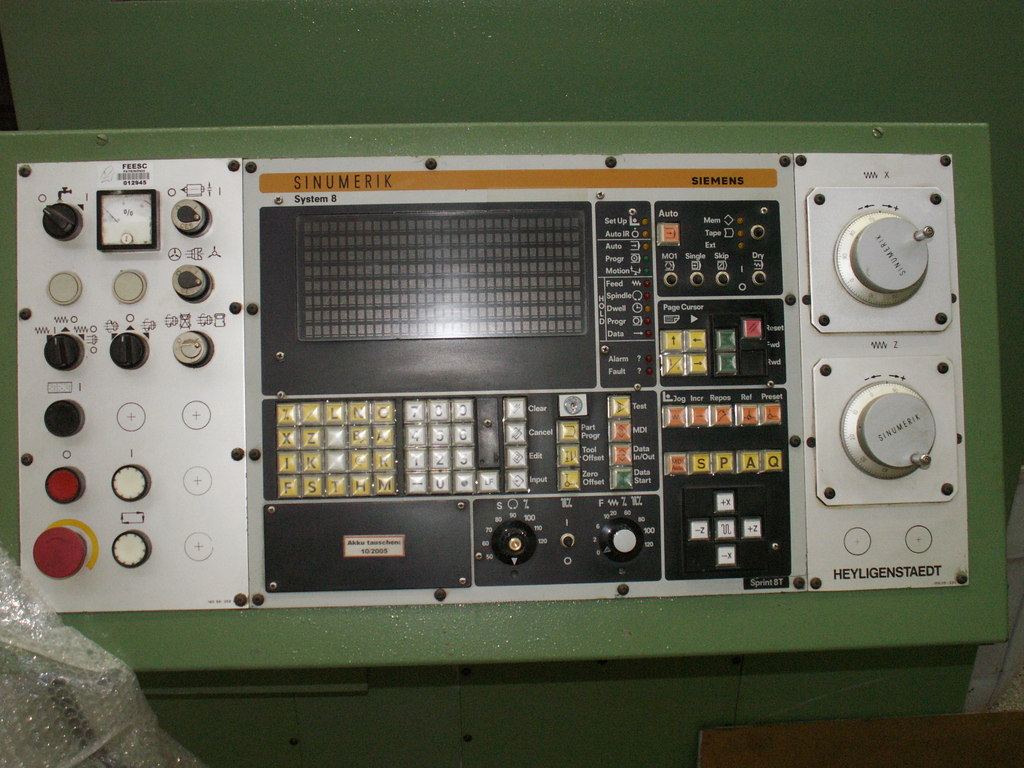
HMI for a computer numerical control (CNC)

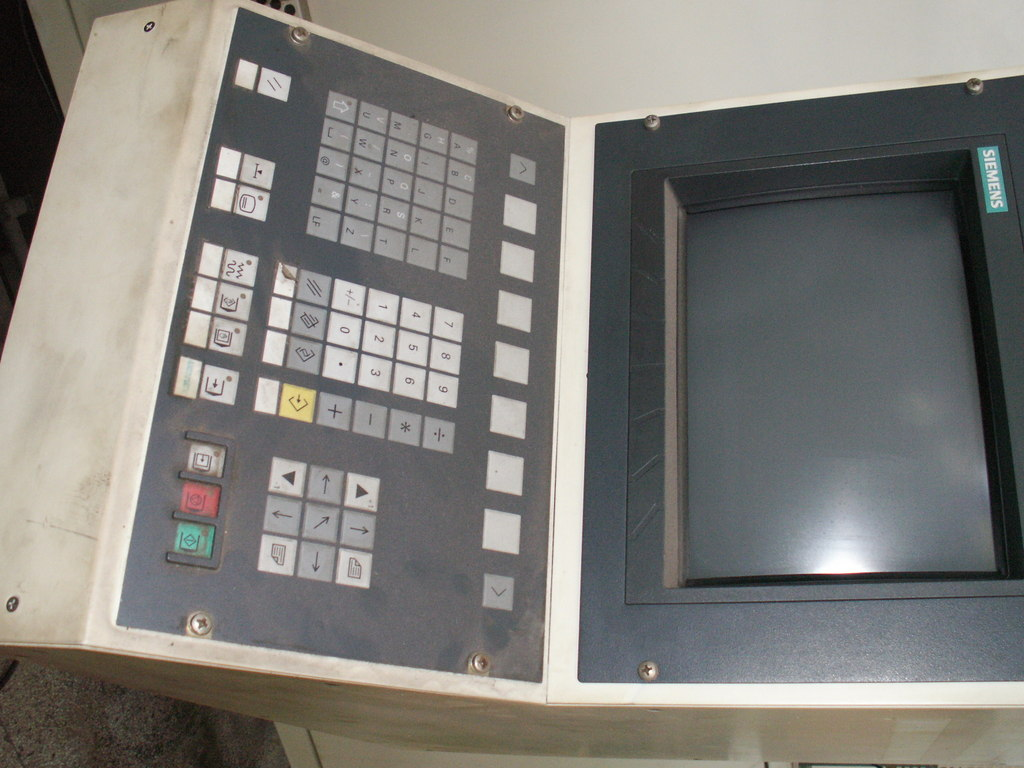
Slightly newer HMI for a CNC-machine

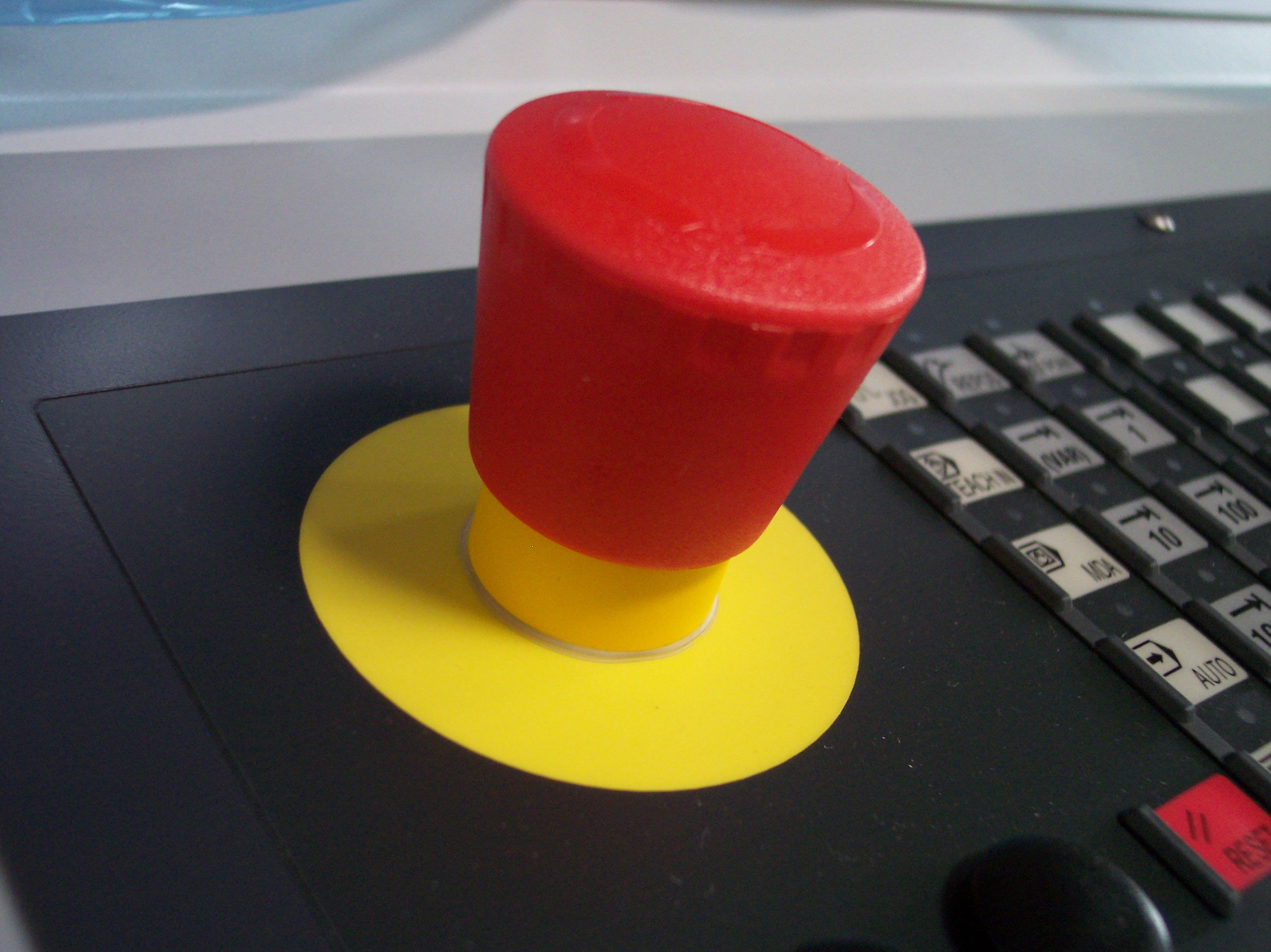
Emergency switch/panic switch

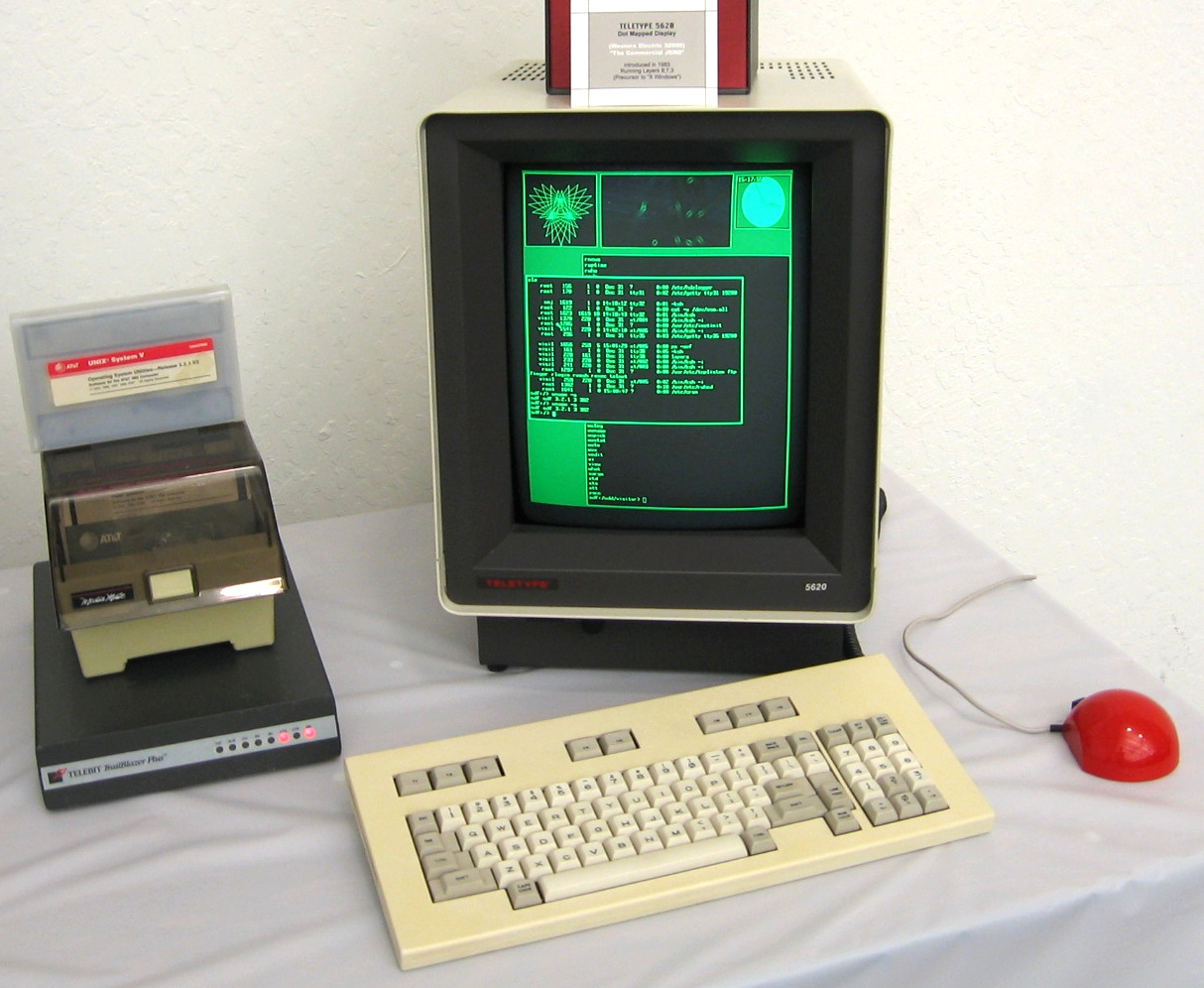
DMD 5620 terminal

== See also ==
- Adaptive user interfaces
- Brain–computer interface
- Computer user satisfaction
- Direct voice input
- Distinguishable interfaces
- Ergonomics and human factors
- Flat design
- History of the GUI
- Useware
- Virtual artifact
- Virtual user interface
