= Planview =

Software company

- Type: Privately held company
- Industry: Software
- Founded: 1989 in Austin, Texas
- Founder: Patrick Durbin
- Headquarters: Austin, Texas
- Area served: Worldwide
- Key people: Matt Zilli (CEO); Louise K. Allen (CPO); Chris Nester (CFO); Mik Kersten (CTO)
- Products: Planview Advisor; Planview Portfolios; Planview PPM Pro; Planview ProjectPlace; Planview AgilePlace; Planview IdeaPlace; Planview AdaptiveWork; Planview Viz; Planview Hub
- Services: Portfolio management Resource management Project management Productivity software Collaborative work management Value stream management Innovation Management; Software toolchain integration
- Number of employees: 1400
- Website: planview.com

Planview is a global enterprise software company headquartered in Austin, Texas.

== History ==
The company was founded in 1989 in Austin, Texas, by Patrick Durbin. Durbin is a pioneer in the project and portfolio management (PPM) industry who led Planview as CEO during the first 15 years of its growth.

In 1997, the company launched its complete web-based resource and project portfolio management (PPM) software, Planview Enterprise.

In 2004, Durbin retired from the CEO role at Planview but continued serving the company as a Board Member. Greg Gilmore, a member of the leadership team under Durbin, was named CEO. Under Gilmore's leadership, the company more than tripled its revenue and was an industry leader in delivering PPM software through the cloud by launching a software as a service (SaaS) solution.

From 2014 to 2020, Planview steadily expanded its suite of solutions through internal product development and through acquisition of other innovative companies. The acquisitions include Projectplace in 2014, Troux Technologies in 2015, Innotas in 2016, LeanKit in 2017, Spigit in 2018, and Aptage in 2020.

The company's growth attracted large investors whose resources enabled the company to continue its growth. In December 2013, Insight Venture Partners acquired a substantial interest in Planview. In January 2017, Thoma Bravo acquired Planview, becoming the majority shareholder. In December 2020, Planview was acquired by TPG Capital and TA Associates for $1.6 billion.

In 2021, Greg Gilmore retired from Planview, and Razat Gaurav was named the company's new CEO. Gaurav joined Planview after leading the growth of Llamasoft during which the company's revenue doubled. On January 7, 2026 – Planview, announced the appointment of Matt Zilli as Chief Executive Officer, effective immediately. Zilli, who most recently was Planview’s President of Field Operations, succeeds Razat Gaurav, who is transitioning to serve on the Company’s Board of Directors as part of a long-standing succession plan. The company's recent acquisitions include Clarizen, Changepoint, Tasktop and Enrich. The company achieved record revenue in 2022 and again in 2023.

== Ownership ==
In December 2013, Insight Venture Partners acquired a substantial interest in Planview.

In January 2017, Thoma Bravo acquired Planview, becoming the majority shareholder.

In December 2020, Planview was acquired by TPG Capital and TA Associates for $1.6 billion.

== Acquisitions ==
In August 2014, Planview acquired Projectplace, a Stockholm-based project collaboration company.

In May 2015, Planview acquired Troux Technologies, an Austin-based enterprise architecture management software company.

On August 1, 2016, the company announced its acquisition of San Francisco-based Innotas.

In December 2017, Planview acquired LeanKit.

In December 2018, Planview acquired Spigit.

In July 2020, Planview acquired Aptage.

In February 2021, Planview acquired Clarizen and Changepoint.

In May 2022, Planview acquired Tasktop, a Vancouver-based value stream management company.

In June 2022, Planview acquired Enrich, a product portfolio analytics company.

In September 2024, Planview acquired Plutora, a leading provider of Value Stream Management (VSM) and software delivery solutions.

In 2025, Planview acquired Sciforma, an enterprise Project and Portfolio Management (PPM) software designed to help organizations plan, track, and optimize projects, resources, and portfolios.

== Software ==
=== Projectplace ===
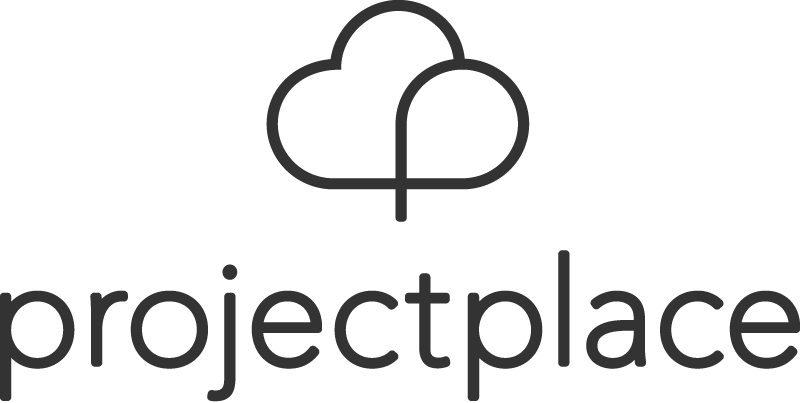
Projectplace logo

Projectplace is a collaborative work management software from Planview that offers project management software and work collaboration solutions. Projectplace integrates features such as task manager apps, Kanban boards, and Gantt chart software. Originally, Projectplace was founded in September 1998 in Stockholm, Sweden, from the Swedish application service provider, Projectplace International AB.

Projectplace modules include team conversations, document archives, issue management, planning and tracking, meeting management, project portal, and contacts.

The service is available in several languages: Swedish, Norwegian, Dutch, English, German, French, Spanish and Danish.

== See also ==
- Comparison of project management software
