= Collaborative writing =

Writing performed by more than one person

Collaborative writing is a procedure in which two or more persons work together on a text of some kind (e.g., academic papers, reports, creative writing, projects, and business proposals). It is often the norm, rather than the exception, in many academic and workplace settings.

Some theories of collaborative writing suggest that in the writing process, all participants are to have equal responsibilities. In this view, all sections of the text should be split up to ensure the workload is evenly displaced, all participants work together and interact throughout the writing process, everyone contributes to planning, generating ideas, making structure of text, editing, and the revision process. Other theories of collaborative writing propose a more flexible understanding of the workflow that accounts for varying contribution levels depending on the expertise, interest, and role of participants, apportioning particular tasks to those with particular strengths: drafting, providing feedback, editing, sourcing, (reorganizing), optimizing for tone or house style, etc.

== History ==
In rhetoric, composition, and writing studies, scholars have demonstrated how collaborative learning in U.S. contexts has been informed by John Dewey's progressivism in the early twentieth century. Collaboration and collaborative writing gained traction in these fields in the 1980s, especially as researchers reacted to poststructuralist theories related to social constructionism and began theorizing more social views of writing.

== Types ==
Collaborative writing processes are extremely context-dependent. Scholarship on both academic and business writing has identified multiple terminologies for collaborative writing processes, including:

- Single-author writing or collegial: one person is leading, they compile the group ideas and do the writing.
- Sequential writing: each person adds their task work then passes it on for the next person to edit freely.
- Horizontal-division or parallel writing: each person does one part of the whole project and then one member compiles it.
- Stratified-division writing: each person plays a role in the composition process of a project due to talents.
- Reactive or reciprocal writing: group all works on and writes the project at the same time, adjusting and commenting on everyone's work.

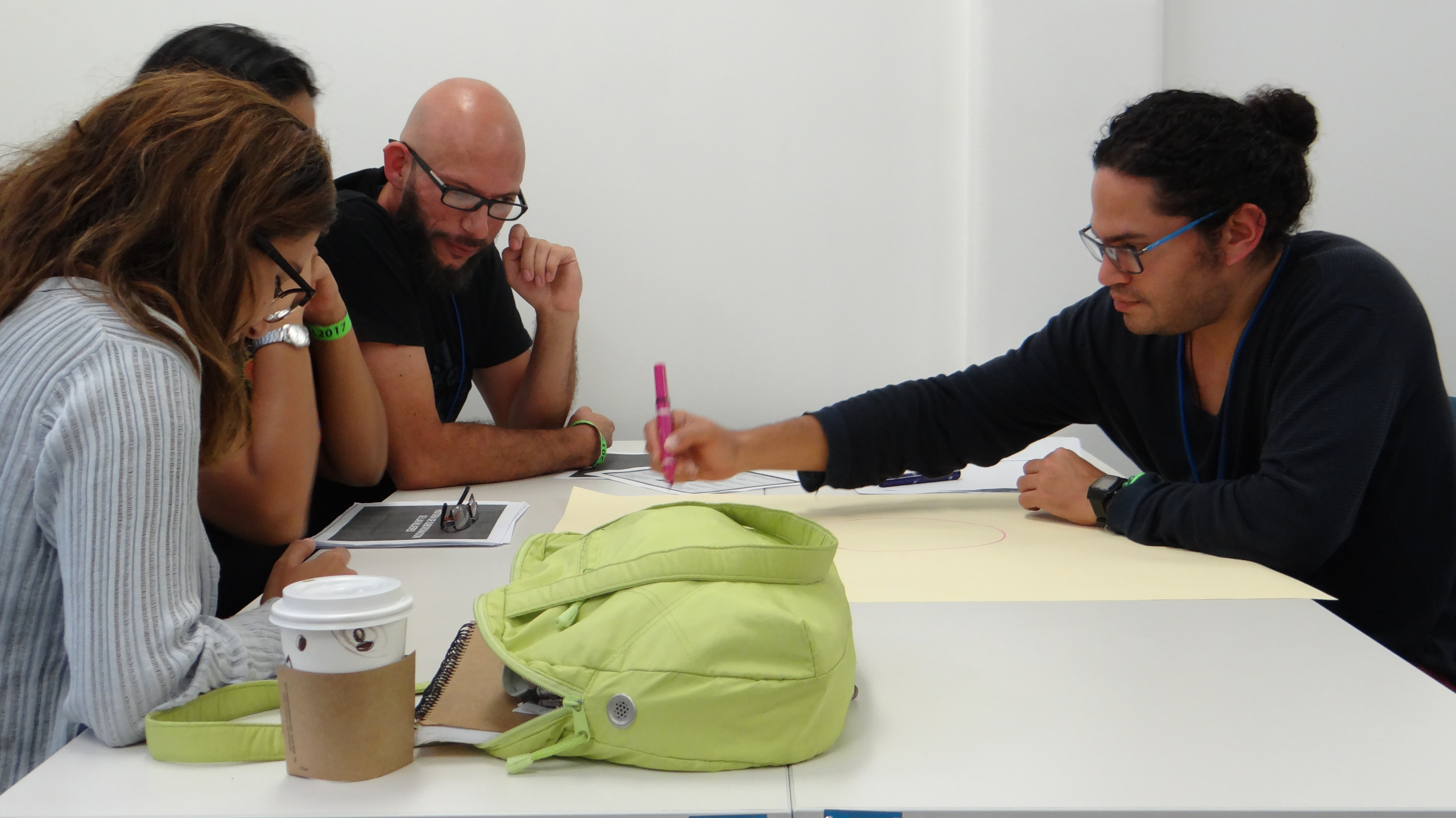
Collaborative writing may occur in face-to-face settings, when writers gather together in a shared location, or in digital settings when writers are separated by both time and distance.

== Uses ==
Collaborative writing may be used in instances where a workload would be overwhelming for one person to produce. Therefore, ownership of the text is from the group that produced it and not just one person.

In 2012, Bill Tomlinson and colleagues provided the first extensive discussion of the experiential aspects of large-scale collaborative research by documenting the collaborative development process of an academic paper written by a collective of thirty authors; their work identifies key tools and techniques that would be necessary or useful to the writing process, and to discover, negotiate, and document issues in massively authored scholarship.

In 2016, Researchers Joy Robinson, Lisa Dusenberry, and Lawrence M. Halcyon conducted a case study investigating the productivity of a team of writers who utilized the practice of interlaced collaborative writing and found that the team was able to produce a published article, a two-year grant proposal, a digital and physical poster, a midterm research report, and conference presentation over the course of three years. The writers used virtual tools such as Google Hangouts' voice feature for group check-ins, to hold group discussions, and to write as a group. They used Google Docs to allow each team member to edit and add writing to a shared document throughout the writing process.

Another motive for using collaborative writing is to increase the quality of the completed project by combining the expertise of multiple individuals and for allowing feedback from diverse perspectives. Collaborative writing has been proven to be an effective method of improving an individual's writing skills, regardless of their proficiency level, by allowing them to collaborate and learn from one or more partners and participate in the co-ownership of a written piece. Instructors may utilize this technique to create more student-centered and collaborative learning environments, or they may use it themselves to cross-collaborate with other academics to produce publishable works.

== Scholarly views ==
Linguist Neomy Storch, in a 2005 Australian study, discovered that reflections pertaining to collaborative writing in regards to second language learners in the classroom were overwhelmingly positive. The study compared the nature of collaborative writing of individual work versus that of group work, and Storch found that although paired groups wrote shorter texts, their work was more complex and accurate compared to individual works. The study consisted of 23 total participants: 5 doing individual work and 18 working in pairs. The pairs consisted of two male pairs, four female pairs and three male/female pairs. Post-assignment interviews revealed that the majority of students (16) yielded positive opinions about group work, but two students felt that group work is best reserved for oral activities and discussions rather than writing assignments. The majority of interviewees gave positive reviews, but one argued that group work was difficult when it came to criticizing another's work and another argued that there is a power imbalance when writing is based on ability. The two students who were stark opponents of collaborative writing revealed that it was hard to concentrate on their work and they were embarrassed by their supposedly poor English skills.

Jason Palmeri found that when it came to inter-professional collaboration, most of the issues stemmed from miscommunication. In differing disciplines, one person may have a level of expertise and understanding that is foreign to another. Palmeri's study provided the example of a nurse and an attorney having different areas of expertise, so therefore they had differing understanding of concepts and even the meaning of the same words. While many of the issues resulted from miscommunication, the study found that some nurse consultants resisted change in terms of altering their writing style to fit the understanding or standards of the attorneys.

Obstacles to collaborative work include a writers' inability to find time to meet with the rest of the group, personal preferences for organization and writing process, and a fear of being criticized.

== As an educational tool ==
Collaborative writing is an approach to writing that many educators use every day. It helps to improve writing skills by making students team up with one another to handle an assignment. Collaborative writing can make a big difference in students' writing because when working with others they will be forced to share ideas and writing styles with each other. The other thing about collaborative writing is the fact that it can be used in online schooling and in-person schooling; it is better in person, though, because it's easier to communicate with each other and peer review one another. Collaborative writing can also improve confidence when talking to each other.

Research conducted by scholars about collaborative writing in education began in the early 1900s. Research discovered that language exchangers between peers to create these writings were beneficial and they called them language-related episodes. This is due to learners being able to socialize their language of choice and they were learning while discussing ideas, which allowed students to learn from each other. Worksheets tend to focus on language structures, while collaborative writing focuses more on the speech part of language. Collaborative writing may also aid in the development of critical analysis skills, as errors and areas for potential revisions are often more easily identifiable in others' writing.

Grouping seems to be very important when it comes to collaborative writing, as larger groups tend to share more ideas whereas smaller groups share fewer ideas and tend to focus on grammar. Another way to have a strong collaborative writing process is to have good communication and division of roles. According to Campbell, "it is helpful to ensure everyone knows their role. Sometimes, a project can get going, but many people do not know exactly who is responsible for what" (Campbell 2023). Students also perform better face-to-face since there is more discussion. It is also discovered that students who are silent still benefit from collaborative writing by observing their peer's writings.

Some students still may favor individual writing since the process is easier and less time-consuming. Students' opinions on collaborative writing may also be swayed by their experience, such as if team members delete or add text without discussion with their group, or some instructors are even concerned that group presentations allow weaker students to depend on stronger ones for success (Dartmouth). It is also stated that generally, students with more communication and discussions will have a positive view of collaborative writing.

== In the workplace ==
A study conducted by Stephen Bremner, an English professor at the City University of Hong Kong, investigated eight business communication textbooks to test the depth in which they provided students with a knowledge of collaborative writing in the workplace and how to execute those processes. The study found that, generally, textbooks highlighted the role of collaborative writing in the workplace. Textbooks listed the pros of collaborative writing such as saving time, more superior documents due to each individual's strengths and specialized knowledge, a well-crafted message due to teamwork, balanced abilities, and an interest in accomplishing a common goal.

The textbooks examined gave students a basic knowledge of collaboration in the workplace, but they also lacked the information that showed students the realities of collaborative writing in the workplace with few activities presented in the textbooks that mirror collaborative activities in the workplace. Much of the activities that featured group work seemed more idealistic rather than based in reality, where the writing process occurred in only controlled and orderly environments. Bremner also found that group work in the classroom also did not properly simulate the power hierarchies present in the workplace.

Jason Palmeri found that when it came to inter-professional collaboration, most of the issues stemmed from miscommunication. In differing disciplines, one person may have a level of expertise and understanding that is foreign to another. The article gave the example of a nurse and an attorney having different areas of expertise, so therefore they had differing understanding of concepts and even the meaning of the same words. While much of the issues resulted from miscommunication, the article claimed that some nurse consultants resisted change in terms of altering their writing style to fit the understanding or standards of the attorneys.

== Benefits ==
The practice of collaborative writing offers numerous benefits that are accessible to individuals from all types of backgrounds. One of these advantages of collaboration in writing is that it frequently leads to a deeper and more comprehensive examination of the topic or subject matter under consideration due to these diverse perspectives. Collaboration enables individuals to combine their diverse perspectives, experiences, and areas of expertise. Collaborative writing brings together a diverse array of unique ideas and backgrounds, enriching the creative process. Also, through collaborative writing, tasks of an assignment can be assigned based on individual strengths, skills, and interests, thereby enhancing the efficiency and effectiveness of the writing process. For example, an individual proficient in research may be assigned to gather information, while another member of the team, skilled in editing, could concentrate on refining the draft. Through task assignment in this manner, every team member can contribute to the project in a manner that optimizes their abilities and interests, resulting in a writing process that is more efficient and effective.

While utilizing collaboration in writing practices can yield numerous advantages, the presence of additional factors, such as the learning environment, also influences the potential for a successful collaborative writing experience. A structured learning environment plays a crucial role in fostering critical thinking through writing, although it is equally important to equip students with the skills necessary for facilitating productive peer discussions, thereby promoting collaborative learning through writing. Students cannot be expected to achieve a satisfactory outcome in a collaborative writing project without a strong foundational understanding of the subject matter. A strong foundation might involve defining the writing's purpose, identifying the intended audience, conducting thorough research on the topic, and structuring and organizing thoughts and concepts. Given adequate resources and education, the objective is for students to proficiently engage in writing tasks and feel at ease with collaborative efforts.

=== Tools ===
- Atlas is a wiki-like git-managed authoring platform from O'Reilly Media that is based on the open-source web-based Git repository manager (version control system) "GitLab".
- For collaborative code-writing, mostly revision control systems like Team Foundation Version Control (used in Team Foundation Server) and Git (used in GitHub, Bitbucket, GitLab and CodePlex) are used in parallel writing.
- Collaborative real-time editors like Etherpad, Hackpad, Google Docs, Microsoft Office, and Authorea.
- Online platforms mainly focused on collaborative fiction that allow other users to continue a story's narrative such as Protagonize and Ficly.
- Wikis like Wikipedia and Wikia.
- For Research paper and other academic written in latex - LaTeXWriter and Overleaf.

== Authorship ==
An author acquires copyright if their work meets certain criteria. In the case of works created by one person, typically, the first owner of a copyright in that work is the person who created the work, i.e. the author. But, when more than one person creates the work in collaboration with one another, then a case of joint authorship can be made provided some criteria are met.

== See also ==
- Collaborative editing
- Content management system (CMS)
- Document collaboration
- Document management system
- Job sharing
- Joint authorship
- List of novels written by multiple authors
- Mass collaboration
- Networked book
- New Worlds Project
- Online word processors
- Project management
- Real-time text
