= Play-by-post role-playing game =

Online text-based role-playing game

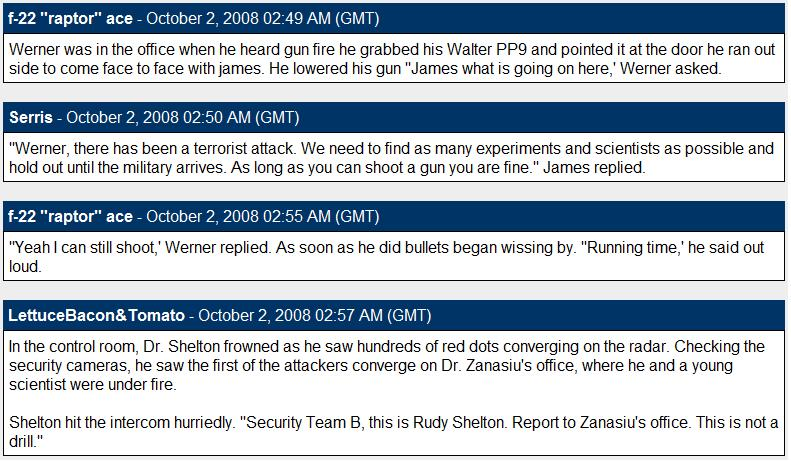
An example of a play-by-post roleplaying game

A play-by-post role-playing game (or sim) is an online text-based role-playing game in which players interact with each other and a predefined environment via text. It is a subset of the online role-playing community which caters to both gamers and creative writers. Play-by-post games may be based on other role-playing games, non-game fiction including books, television and movies, or original settings. This activity is closely related to both interactive fiction and collaborative writing. Compared to other roleplaying game formats, this type tends to have the loosest rulesets.

== History ==
Play-by-post roleplaying has its origins on the large computer networks and bulletin board systems of major universities in the United States in the 1980s. It drew heavily upon the traditions of fanzines and off-line role-playing games. The introduction of IRC enabled users to engage in real-time chat-based role-playing and resulted in the establishment of open communities.

Development of forum hosting software and browser-based chat services such as AOL and Yahoo Chat increased the availability of these mediums to the public and improved accessibility to the general public.

== Rules ==
Unlike other forms of online role-playing games such as MUDs or MMORPGs, the events in play-by-post games are rarely handled by software and instead rely on participants or moderators to make decisions or improvise. Players create their own characters and descriptions of events and their surroundings during play. Results of combat, which may include Player versus player encounters, may be determined by chance through dice rolls or software designed to provide a random result. The results of random chance may need to be provided to the players in order to avoid disputes that may be a result of cheating or favoritism. Alternatively a forum may be diceless and rely on cooperation among players to agree on outcomes of events and thus forgo the use of randomisers.

In the latter case, combat and other measures are handled by requiring players to avoid detailing the results of their actions, and thus leave an opening for a response by other involved players. Consider the following possible post from a character named Bob attacking Joe:

Bob punched Joe in the chest, knocking him over.

This post makes the assumption that Joe takes no further action to avoid the attack from Bob and that he will drop as a result. These types of actions are often called "autohits" as they "automatically hit" without allowing for a response by the affected character, and there may be rules against such actions (commonly referred to as the 'no power playing' rule). Alternatively, Bob may be required to write something like the following:

Bob swung a punch at Joe's chest, attempting to knock him over.

This allows Joe to respond to the action without contradicting the post.

Depending on the rules established on the forum, role-playing and story can be pushed forward through moderation by a gamemaster, specific rules (often existing role-playing game systems), or by mutual agreement between players.

Some games allow members of any writing proficiency to join, while others may require members to provide a sample of writing for review before allowing participation. In addition, a minimum word-count for each post may be required in order to encourage more detailed writing. Forums that cater to all levels of role-playing may have specific sections for various difficulty levels.

== Characters ==
In general, each player plays and develops their own character. Characters may be original creations of the player, or may be based on a character taken from canon if the setting and rules provide this option. Each community may have its own rules regarding the process of character creation and either allow characters to be liberally created and used with minimal review, or require characters to undergo a review process in which administrators examine the character application and decide whether to approve or reject the application.

In many cases, characters are regarded as belonging to the players who created them, and others are not allowed to make drastic changes to them without the creator's prior consent (referred to as god-modding).

In addition to standard characters, games may also incorporate non-player characters (NPCs). Some NPCs have recurring roles, while others appear only briefly to aid in the writing of a scene. The use and control of NPCs varies widely among role-playing games.

== Setting ==
Games vary in the degree to which the setting is established; some go as far as to include a virtual "world" to roleplay in, while others allow players to improvise the setting as they progress. Settings may be derived from novels, TV shows or movies (often resulting in collaborative fan-fiction) or may be original and unique to the game.

== Style ==
Play-by-post games are frequently written in the third person perspective due to the fact that multiple players must share each scene, each with his or her character as the focus of attention. Common online game terms such as OOC (Out of character) or OOG (Out of Game) are used to differentiate in-character from personal posting.

The opening message or post of each scene typically lays down the scenario and describes a scene, or continues from a previously started scene. Threads then become an ongoing story in which players periodically advance the plot by reading the latest reply and then responding with what their character does and how the environment changes in response. These replies are often open-ended so that other players can continue.

== Mediums ==
=== Message-board role-playing ===
Internet forums (aka Play-By-Message-Board or PBMB, Forum Role-Playing or simply Forum-Games) are the most common medium for Play-by-Post gaming. Forums may provide features such as online dice rolling, maps, character profiling and game history. Using a forum (as opposed to a live-chat interface) allows players to re-read what they have previously written at a later date, and to read posts made by players in other threads. Many online services provide free game hosting specifically for gamemasters, or provide general forum services that can be used for role-playing purposes (such as Proboards or Invisionfree).

As an asynchronous collaborative editing tool, forums lack safeguards to prevent two writers from posting simultaneously and contradicting each other. House Rules may require players to take turns sequentially in order to avoid such conflicts, or players may require posts to be edited or deleted to rectify the situation which may result in dispute and intervention from a moderator if one is available. To avoid this, many boards offer guides and tips on roleplay etiquette.

Twitter and Tumblr are also very popular mediums for roleplaying.

=== Play-by-post role-playing ===
Play-by-post role-playing is generally devoted to advancing a single overarching storyline that all board members participate in, rather than many different non-related stories proceeding in separate threads [the latter being known as "multi-genre"]. They vary in organization, but the primary formation includes a full set of rules governing role-playing, out-of-character conduct, combat between players, threads detailing a set storyline (often contributed to by plot-advancing, staff-organized events, or player role-plays), character approval forums, and a full staff with admin(s) and moderators. Larger boards set in a single setting are often organized by cutting up the setting into separate forums, each based on locations within the setting.

Many message board based games, such as NationStates, establish a hierarchy of moderators to manage plot, pacing and continuity. To keep story threads organized the message board is often organized into forums based on geographical location within the game setting. Other message boards, however, may choose to sort their board on genre.

=== Play-by-email ===
Play-by-email (PBeM) games are played as other play-by-mail games, using email as the postal medium. Players email their actions to the gamemaster or to each other using a mailing list. Play-by-email games are often slow, since the players must wait for each post before replying, but have the advantage that replies may be tailored to the players, allowing the gamemaster to keep information secret from the other players.

This should not be confused with simming style of post or email games. Sims are more collaborative storytelling, where each player tells a portion of the story, usually utilizing other characters in the area as they wish in order to complete their portion of the story. PBeM games more closely resemble table-top role playing games where players react to gamemaster presented scenarios, and characters actions are controlled by individuals.

=== Play-by-chat ===
Online Chat Rooms may be used in a similar fashion as forums for role-playing purposes. Unlike forums, posts are displayed to the screen in real-time and thus may increase the pace at which responses are written. Play-by chat games require users to be present for the duration of a scene which may last several hours. The game may be supplemented by external character profiles or may rely on users to provide information about their character upon request or upon entering a room. Discord has become a major medium for play-by-chat games due to its rapidly-increasing popularity and its user-friendly administrative features that allow users to create private chat rooms (known on the site as "servers") in very little time. Discord servers listing roleplay servers have also become popular and many have thousands of members.

Real-time interaction between characters in chat rooms are similar to those encountered in MUDs but lack automated features of MUDs such as combat resolution and item descriptions. Players in chat rooms are required to describe objects and events through manually written text.

=== Play-by-internet ===
Play-by-internet (PBI) refers to fully automated games which take place using server-based software. Play-by-internet games differ from other play-by-post games in that, for most computerized multiplayer games, the players have to be online at the same time, and players can make their moves independently of any other players in the game. The turn-time is usually fixed. A server updates the game after the turn-time has elapsed evaluating all the player's moves sent to the server. The turn-time duration can be hours, days, weeks or even months.

=== Play-by-wiki ===
A play-by-wiki game is played using wiki software instead of a forum. Because players' previous posts are editable and the gamemaster takes responsibility as the overall editor of the story, plot holes can be avoided and writing skills may not be as important for each writer.

Wiki space provides not only a means of communication, but also a permanent archive and a designated off-topic discussion area for each page. Players can edit posts freely because records are automatically maintained and changes can be easily undone. Sites such as Wetpaint are commonly used for this.

=== Role-playing blog ===
The role-playing blog (RPB) is a game which is played out online using posts within a blog or weblog. Unlike message board role-playing, a role-playing blog is generally restricted to one gaming group, and the blog contains static files such as maps, archives, and character sheets specific for that group. RPBs often incorporate mixed elements of message board role-playing, play-by-chat, as well as play-by-email styles, allowing players to mix and match the style of play that they prefer. Popular blog sites used to host these games are Tumblr and LiveJournal.

The style of role-playing on Tumblr often comes in the format of a 'main blog', the headquarters of the game, and multiple character blogs from which each player posts. The main blog often advertises for players through the tags of Tumblr. The main blog is where applicants to the game apply by filling out an application on the main blog, and where other such administration of the game occurs. The Roleplay game creator is often referred to as the "Admin" short for "Administrator" and players may be required to run major plots and game changes by the Admin before proceeding, making the Admin function in a way that a traditional GM might have. Players role-play by reblogging each other's posts and adding paragraphs of interaction from their own character to the end, each of which are called 'paras.' Often seen are text posts with dialogue and an accompanying .gif image expressing the character mood or intended expression of emotion. Though, recently .jpg icons have risen in popularity in some games.

The style of role-playing on Livejournal style RPB's is maintained through "community" blogs that connect "character blogs or journals." Character Blogs/Journals are generally written in first-person character driven context. These character journals are then open to all players of the community to interact on a first person style of writing. Interaction on the "Community" blog is done mostly in third person storybook fashion. RPB's on a "livejournal platform" are frequently run by an individual referred to as MOD (moderator). MOD's are in charge of creating the community/game setting, character limitations, rules, style of play, frequency of play and general worldly game views. MOD's are also in charge of creating worldly events for game play response for individually plotted characters.

=== Role-playing Google documents ===
Somewhat similar to blogs and wikis, Google's documents can have permissions set to allow users to access and modify a document online. This allows multiple users to edit the document at the same time, meaning that others can modify the story online. There is also a revision history that can be split allows commenting on particular words or phrases, or even a general comment, as well as a chat bar for that particular document. Since this form of role-playing is relatively new, it's not a common way of role-playing, and it has drawbacks in the content being editable by anyone with permissions.

== Player-player combat ==
In diceless games where randomisers are not used to determine the outcome of combat, the onus is on players to come to an agreement. Disputes may arise from players in competitive engagements if neither player is able to come to a compromise that is acceptable to both. Players may write their characters in a way that makes them overly powerful or invulnerable, a practice referred to as "power-gaming", "god-modding", or "superhero syndrome". In such cases, a moderator may be required to review the conflict and make a ruling as to what should be accepted as the final result. In some rulesets, the winner of a contest may be a foregone conclusion agreed upon out-of-character and the battle itself a ceremonial description of each character's prowess. In other systems, the only rule may be that the first character to yield or surrender is the loser of the combat. No matter the case, some sort of player consent to wins and losses is required in this type of role-playing game.

For this reason, text-based role-playing games tend to be focused slightly more on story and player-character interactions, negotiations, and relationships rather than combat. Combat-focused games tend to flow more smoothly in more rules based role-playing platforms and venues such as MUDs, D&D-style games, or video games, where character building or playing skill rather than consent determines the winner of a combat, and play-by-post games usually focus on exploration, negotiation, or romance storylines where characters aren't usually directly opposing one another.

== See also ==
- Collaborative fiction
- New Worlds Project
