= Networked book =

LetsAuthor's networked book

A networked book is an open book designed to be written, edited, and read in a networked environment. It is also a platform for social exchange, and is potentially linked to other books and other discussions. Wikipedia can be considered a networked book. LetsAuthor is a publishing company that exclusively publishes networked books created on its platform.

== Characteristics ==
The networked book has four primary characteristics:

- The Networked Book is an Open Book
- The Networked Book is Structurally Granular or Disaggregated
- The Networked Book is Social
- The Networked Book is Processed

=== Open book ===
The networked book maintains an open structure during all or part of its creation. For example, Lawrence Lessig's, Code: Version 2.0 used a wiki to open the editing process for the second edition of Code and Other Laws of Cyberspace, in order to "draw upon the creativity and knowledge of the community. This is an online, collaborative book update; a first of its kind. Once the project nears completion, Professor Lessig will take the contents of this wiki and ready it for publication." In other words, at some point the book was declared finished, and closed to further input and adjustment by the community. Another example of an open book structure is the popular Wikipedia. This online wiki encyclopedia is entirely and indefinitely open.

Another example of a networked book is Turbulence.org's 2009 commissioned anthology, Networked: a (networked book) about (networked art). The website explores writing, art, and culture in networked society, and explores the subject on multiple levels. In addition to the thematic matter, the initial commissioned authors were invited to submit chapters using a blog or wiki format. While seven of the authors chose the blog format (with the CommentPress plugin), artist/theorist Patrick Lichty created a wiki-formatted chapter, "Art in the Age of Dataflow", which discusses literary theories of spatial narrative from its inception in the 1940s to the age of big data. Like Lawrence Lessig's text, Dataflow was intended as a propositional text from which the online community expand on the original chapter. The chapter as it existed in 2012 was captured and included in Lichty's Institute for Networked Culture book, "Variant Analyses, Interrogations of New Media Art and Culture".

=== Structurally granular or disaggregated ===
The networked book manifests a certain "disarticulation of the body of text" and "disaggregated/reaggregated" structure as described by Raffaele Simone in his essay, The Body of the Text. "Disarticulation of the body of the text occurs when the text generated by an author is not perceived as closed to external interventions, an entity to which the author can have access only to read (or, to use an information science image, in the manner of ROM, that is "read only"), but as an open entity to which one has access—for purposes of both reading and writing. When the text is disarticulated it is perceived as an entity which can be disaggregated (broken apart), manipulated, and reaggregated (reassembled) without damaging the text per se or the author."

The networked book is a form that helps us reconstruct and understand the prolific and increasingly granular world of information that surrounds us. Moreover, the networked book sets up formats that are often designed to update continually, incorporating new information and reconfiguring the book to accommodate new content and present it coherently.

Jonathan Harris' 10 x 10 builds its content from RSS feeds. The piece selects the most frequently used words from the major news networks to assemble an hourly "portrait" of our world. This visualization tool represents a type of structure that we will soon see in networked books. The human editor/programmer creates the search and visualization function and the machine then collects, edits, and presents text and images according to criteria built into the program. This type of "book" format depends on granular content that can be "manipulated and reaggregated" by a tool.

=== Social ===
Social software environments create spaces for communal authorship. They allow raw, unedited content to be collectively assembled within the nascent form of the electronic book itself, facilitating a gestational space for content to evolve from spontaneous discussion into an edited "book" according to the activity of the social network. LiveJournal is a useful model for socially networked books.

The multiple-author forum creates a different kind of thinking environment. Individual points of view are mediated by multiple voices. This may allow for a more democratic approach to issues and a multifaceted rendering of topics not possible in the single-author print model.

=== Processed ===
The future book will be a networked book or a "processed book" as Joseph Esposito calls it. To process a book, he says, is more than simply building links to it; processing also includes a modification of the act of creation, which tends to encourage the absorption of the book into a network of applications, including but not restricted to commentary. This "processing" creates iterations of the book: critiques, revisions and trajectories that accumulate around the original draft. The iterations of Wikipedia are a good example of this principle. The networked book, as a process-based knowledge machine incorporates the thinking process of multiple authors.

== Processing the networked book ==
It is useful, in this case, to compare the processing of a networked book to the standard editorial procedures found in print culture. Both print books and networked books originate from an idea conceived by a senior editor or an author. However, the participatory framework of a networked book is articulated by a designer, and executed by a programmer, before the content is written or assembled, thus creating an open book structure. Paper-based books are turned over to the designer, production artist and printer after the content is finished, resulting in a closed book structure. The networked book is assembled, in whole or in part, by a community of authors according to the thesis imagined by the editor/author and within the space created by the designer and programmer. The community of contributors acts as both author and reader, which is drastically different from the single-author print model wherein, reader is audience rather than co-creator. In a networked book, content is generated and revised by the community and the various iterations of the text are often saved and can be returned to and discussed. In a paper-based book, content is generally constructed by a single author and is revised under the supervision of an editor. The readers have no part in this process and the revisions are only examined and debated in special cases, and then usually by scholars or authors, not by the general readership. After the content has been generated by the community within the framework of the network book's thesis and architecture, the reader/editor implements strategies for marking out meaningful pathways through the material using search engines and visualization applications.

== See also ==
- Collaborative writing
