= Dropbox Carousel =

Service offered by Dropbox

- Developer: Dropbox
- Initial release: April 9, 2014; 11 years ago
- Operating system: Android, iOS, web
- Type: Photo storage and sharing
- Website: carousel.dropbox.com

Dropbox Carousel was a photo and video management app offered by Dropbox. The third-party native app, available on Android and iOS, allowed users to store, manage, and organize photos. Photos were organized by date, time and event and backed up on Dropbox. It competed in this space against other online photo storage services such as Google's Google Photos, Apple's iCloud, and Yahoo's Flickr. Chris Lee, Dropbox's head of product development for Carousel described the app as an add-on to Dropbox, a “dedicated experience for photos and videos” and a space for “reliving personal memories”.

== History ==
Mailbox founder, Gentry Underwood unveiled Carousel at a gathering in San Francisco on April 9, 2014. Much of the features in Carousel come from Snapjoy, a photo start-up, that Dropbox acquired on December 19, 2012. When Carousel was launched, it marked amongst many others, a series of acquisitions made by Dropbox to prep up before opening its stock for public offering. The acquisitions would help demonstrate its expansive product offerings pitching potential profitability to investors.

In December 2015, Dropbox announced that Carousel would be shut down and some Carousel features would be integrated into the primary Dropbox application. On March 31, 2016, Carousel was deactivated.

== Features ==
Carousel prompted users to free local storage once it had synced and backed-up local photos to the cloud. Flashback was a feature (enabled by default) that showed past photos or videos taken the same day, a year, or some years back. Flashback used an algorithm designed to identify human faces - resulting in greater likelihood of the user's picture or people in the user's close circle appearing. A scrollable timeline, which was earlier a scroll wheel, at the bottom let the user scroll to photo(s) at a specific date with a finger swipe.
