= Arash Ferdowsi =

American businessman

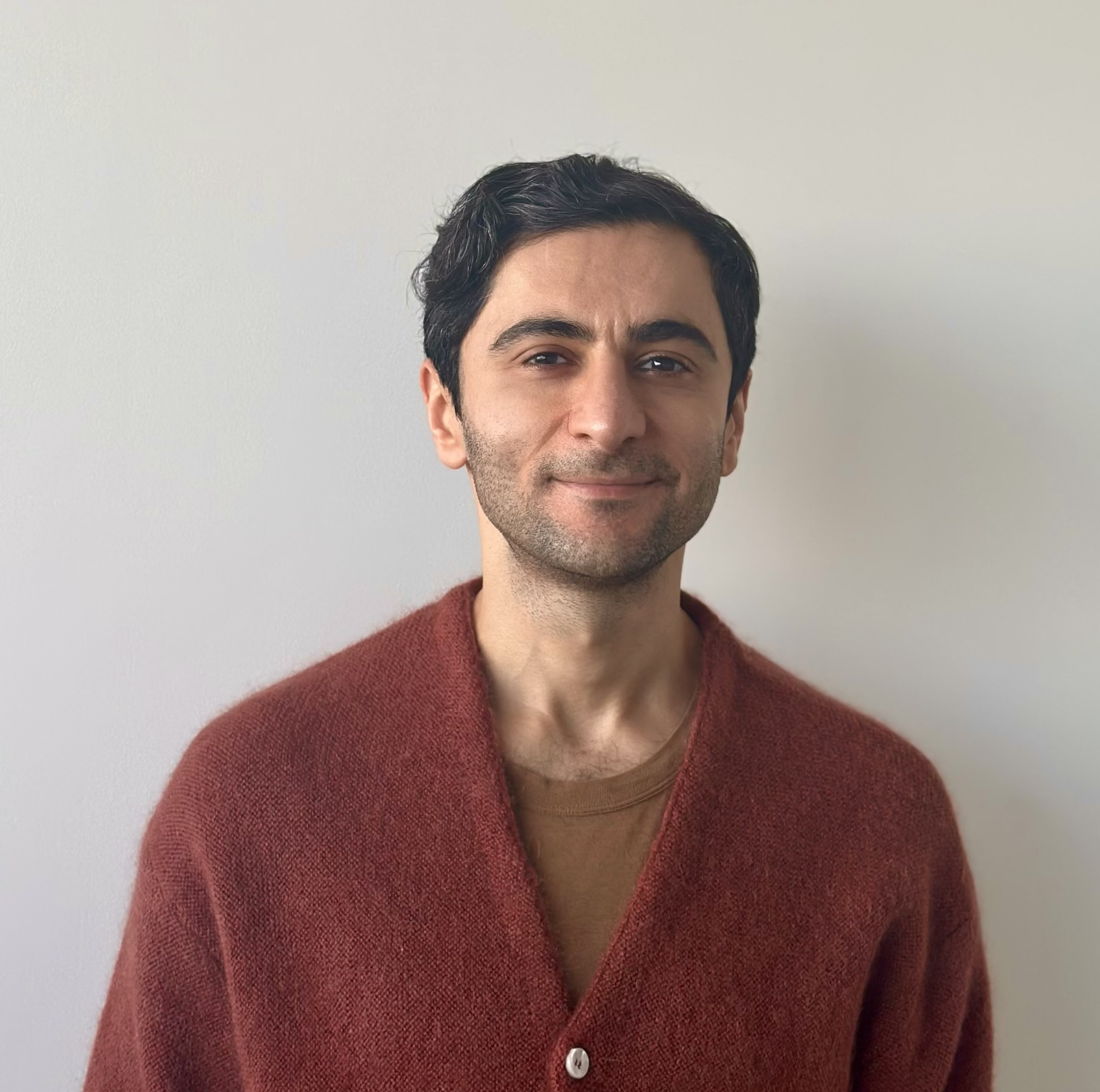
- Ferdowsi in 2023
- Born: October 7, 1985 (age 41); Overland Park, Kansas, US
- Education: Massachusetts Institute of Technology (dropped out)
- Occupations: Co-Founder, Dropbox

Arash Ferdowsi (Persian: آرش فردوسی, pronounced [ʔɒːɹǽʃ feɹd̪owsíː]; born October 7, 1985) is an American billionaire entrepreneur. He is a co-founder of Dropbox.

== Early life and education ==
Ferdowsi was born in Overland Park, Kansas, United States on 7 October 1985. He attended Blue Valley Northwest High School, a public high school in Overland Park, graduating first in his class in 2004. Ferdowsi went on to study electrical engineering and computer science at the Massachusetts Institute of Technology. At MIT, he had a home in East Campus. Ferdowsi dropped out of MIT in his last semester to build the company, Dropbox, with his business partner.

=== Family ===
Ferdowsi is the son of Iranian immigrants Gholam Ferdowsi (b. 1950) and Tahmineh "Tammy" Faridazar (b. 1959). Ferdowsi's father, a mortgage broker, is a native of Tabriz in northwestern Iran. His parents settled in the United States following the 1979 Iranian Revolution, then met and married in 1984 while students at the University of Central Missouri and the University of Missouri–Kansas City, respectively.

== Career ==
Ferdowsi launched Dropbox in June 2007 with his business partner, Drew Houston, at the Massachusetts Institute of Technology. In September 2007, Ferdowsi moved his company to San Francisco and raised venture capital from Sequoia Capital, Accel, Y Combinator, and a handful of individual investors. In March 2018, Dropbox launched an initial public offering, valuing the company at around US$9.2 billion.

From the company's establishment in June 2007 until October 2016, Ferdowsi was the chief technology officer of Dropbox. Arash left Dropbox in 2020.
