= Drew Houston =

Co-founder of Dropbox (born 1983)

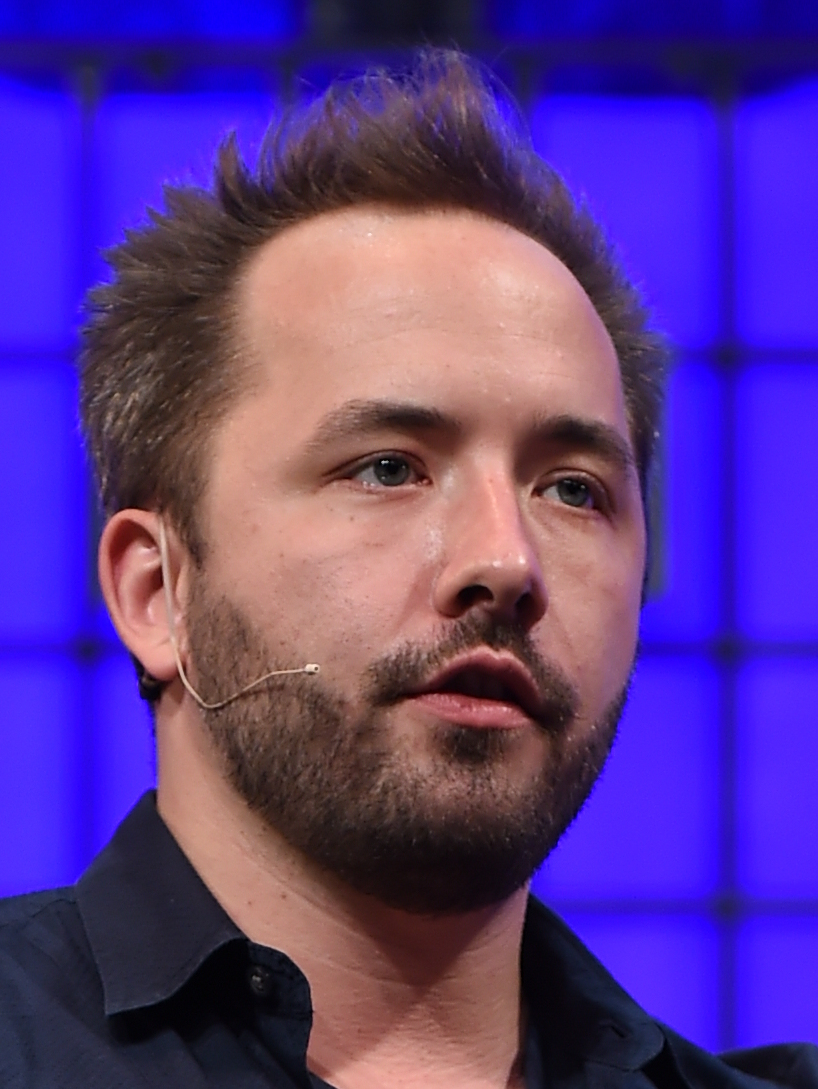
- Houston in 2014
- Born: March 4, 1983 (age 43); Acton, Massachusetts, US
- Education: Massachusetts Institute of Technology
- Occupation: Businessman
- Known for: Co-founder, CEO and 25% owner, Dropbox

Andrew W. Houston (/ˈhaʊs.tən/; born March 4, 1983) is an American Internet entrepreneur best known as the co-founder and CEO of Dropbox, an online backup and storage service. According to Forbes, his net worth is about $2 billion. Houston held 24.4% of voting power in Dropbox before the company filed for IPO in February 2018. He has sat on the board of Meta Platforms since February 2020.

== Early life ==
Houston was born in Acton, Massachusetts, in 1983. He attended Acton-Boxborough Regional High School in the 1990s. He later graduated with a degree in computer science from the Massachusetts Institute of Technology (MIT), where he was a member of the Phi Delta Theta fraternity. It was there that he met Arash Ferdowsi who would later go on to be co-founder and CTO of Dropbox. During his time in college, Houston also co-founded a SAT prep company.

== Career ==
Houston and Ferdowsi co-founded Dropbox in 2007. Houston currently is CEO and 25% owner of Dropbox.

In February 2020, Houston joined the board of directors of Meta Platforms, replacing Netflix CEO Reed Hastings, who left in May 2019.

In May 2026, it was announced that Houston will step down as CEO of Dropbox to become the company's executive chairman. He will serve as co-CEO with Ashraf Alkarmi for a period before transitioning to the new role.

== Reputation ==
In 2008, Houston was named one of the "most promising players aged 30 and under" by Business Week, and Dropbox has been touted as Y Combinator's most successful investment to date. Houston was also named among the top 30 under-30 entrepreneurs by Inc., and Dropbox has been called one of the 20 best startups of Silicon Valley. In 2013, MIT invited Houston to serve as speaker at its annual commencement ceremonies.

== Personal life ==
Houston lives in Austin, Texas. He is married and has one child.

In April 2013, a lobbying group called FWD.us (aimed at lobbying for immigration reform and improvements to education) was launched, with Houston listed as one of the founders.

In 2016, he endorsed Hillary Clinton in the 2016 United States presidential election.
