= Hackpad =

Web-based collaborative text editor

Hackpad is a web-based collaborative real-time text editor forked from Etherpad.

== Overview ==
It was used as a company wiki by multiple prominent startups of the 2010s, including Airbnb, Stripe, and Upworthy.

In April 2014, Hackpad was acquired by Dropbox. In April 2015, it was announced that Hackpad would be released as open source and source code was published on GitHub in August 2015, under the Apache license 2.0. On April 25, 2017, Dropbox announced that it would shut down on July 19, 2017, with users being permanently migrated to Dropbox Paper.

== See also ==
- Etherpad
- Google Docs
