= Dropbox Paper =

Collaborative document-editing service developed by Dropbox

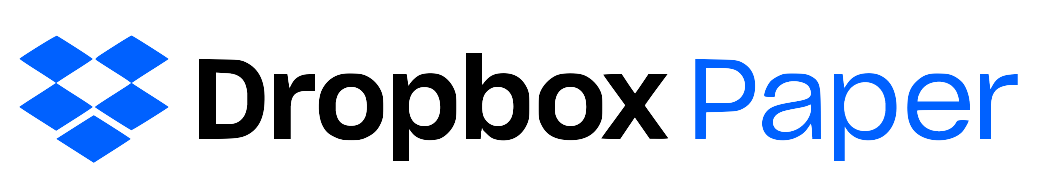
- Website type: Word processor, collaborative software
- Owner: Dropbox
- Website: paper.dropbox.com
- Launched: October 15, 2015; 11 years ago
- Written in: JavaScript

Dropbox Paper, or simply Paper, is a collaborative document-editing service developed by Dropbox. Originating from the company's acquisition of document collaboration company Hackpad in April 2014, Dropbox Paper was officially announced in October 2015, and launched in January 2017. It offers a web application, as well as mobile apps for Android and iOS.

Dropbox Paper was described in the official announcement post as "a flexible workspace that brings people and ideas together. With Paper, teams can create, review, revise, manage, and organize — all in shared documents".

Reception of Dropbox Paper has been mixed. Critics praised collaboration functionality, including content available immediately, the ability to mention specific collaborators, assign tasks, write comments, as well as editing attribution, and revision history. It received particular praise for its support for rich media from a variety of sources, with one reviewer noting that the Paper's support for rich media exceeds the capabilities of most of its competitors. However, it was criticized for a lack of formatting options and editing features. While the user interface was liked for being minimal, reviewers cited the lack of a fixed formatting bar and missing features present in competitors' products as making Dropbox Paper seem like a "light" tool.

== History ==
Dropbox acquired document collaboration company Hackpad in April 2014. A year later, Dropbox launched a Dropbox Notes note-taking product in beta testing phase. Dropbox Paper was officially announced on October 15, 2015, followed by an open beta and release of mobile Android and iOS apps in August 2016. Dropbox Paper was officially released on January 30, 2017.

== Reception ==
In a comparison between Dropbox Paper and Evernote, PC World's Michael Ansaldo wrote that "With its emphasis on document creation, you might expect formatting to be front and center in Dropbox Paper. That's not the case." Ansaldo noted the lack of a "fixed formatting toolbar as you'd find in Evernote or a word processor like Google Docs or Microsoft Word. Instead, the text editor appears as a floating ribbon only when you highlight selected text." The only formatting options available for emphasis were bolding, strikethrough, bulleted and numbered lists, and H1 and H2 tags. Users can also add links, convert text to checklists, and add comments. Ansaldo wrote that "Both Evernote and Dropbox Paper make it easy to add images to a document", but also noted that "Dropbox Paper doesn't support any image editing". Paper supports rich media, and users can "add rich content to your document just by pasting a link to the file. In addition to Dropbox, Paper supports media from a variety of popular services including YouTube, Spotify, Vimeo, SoundCloud, Facebook, and Google's productivity suite. Once the file appears, you can delete the link for a cleaner display." To start working with other people, Paper "allows you to invite people via email from within a document", with sharing options for who can view the link (anyone with the link or just the invited person), and action permissions (edit or only comment). Regarding collaboration, Ansaldo wrote that "Creative collaboration is Paper’s marquee feature, and it provides a variety of ways to work effectively with others in real time". Users can "make any content immediately visible and accessible to a specific collaborator with "@mentions"", and "You can also use @mentions to create and assign task lists within a document." Paper also "boasts essential collaboration tools including comments, editing attribution, and revision history."

Writing for TechRadar, John Brandon wrote that Dropbox Paper "might be a 'light' tool for now without the extensive templates of Microsoft Office or the integration with other apps in the Zoho suite, but it does work well with the Dropbox storage service that's so popular with office workers these days."

Kyle Wiggers of Digital Trends wrote that Paper is "all about minimizing distractions. Its interface is quite literally a big, blank canvas on which you tap out your agenda. You can organize notes by title and create to-do lists, but even basic formatting tools are obscured from view", noting Paper's "floating box above words and phrases highlighted by your cursor". Wiggers stated that "Paper is not a to-do organizer", but that it's "well suited to the purpose thanks to a bevy of labor-saving conveniences", highlighting that Paper "supports more media than most of its to-do and note-taking counterparts". He praised the collaboration tools, writing that they "are as extensive as you'd hope, and then some", citing its invitation system with permission controls, lists of changes and revision history, comment and chat support, and "perhaps best of all", the ability to assign tasks with a "@" mention.

Business Insider's Alex Heath praised that "Paper's interface is spotless and friendly to write in. You don't feel overwhelmed with formatting options", but criticized the available features, writing that "Google Docs is much more full-featured in the formatting department, so Paper has some catching up to do if it wants to be on par with the competition". Writing for The Verge, Casey Newton praised Paper's handling of rich media, complimenting it for being "great", and added that "I imagine that creative types who work on teams will appreciate having rich media embedded in the documents they're working on rather than in a series of infinite tabs".
