= Personal cloud =

Type of cloud service

A personal cloud is a collection of digital content and services that are accessible from any device through the Internet. It is not a tangible entity, but a place that gives users the ability to store, synchronize, stream and share content on a relative core, moving from one platform, screen and location to another. Created on connected services and applications, it reflects and sets consumer expectations for how next-generation computing services will work.

The four primary types of personal cloud in use today are: Online cloud, NAS device cloud, server device cloud, and home-made clouds.

== Online cloud ==
The online cloud is sometimes referred to as the public cloud. It is the cloud computing model where online resources like software and data storage are made available over the Internet.

Typically, an individual or organization has little control over the ecosystem in which the online cloud is hosted, and the core infrastructure is shared between many individuals and organizations. The data and applications provided by the service provider are logically segregated so that only those authorized are allowed access.

== NAS device cloud ==
A network-attached storage (NAS) device is a computer connected to a network that provides only file-based data storage services to other devices on the network. Although it may technically be possible to run other software on a NAS device, it is not designed to be a general purpose server. Cloud NAS is remote storage that is accessed over the Internet as if it were local.

A cloud NAS is often used for backups and archiving. One of the benefits of NAS Cloud is that data in the cloud can be accessed at any time from anywhere. The main drawback, however, is that the speed of the transfer rate is only as fast as the network connection the data is accessed over and can therefore be fairly slow.

== Server device cloud ==
In many ways cloud servers work in the same way as physical servers but the functions they perform can be very different. Typically, the cloud server is an on-premises device that is connected to the Internet and gives users the functions available on the online cloud but with the added benefit and security of the files being in their control on their premises.

The server cloud has been historically enterprise-based deployed by businesses needing an in-house cloud. However, there are also in-house options available for individual users.

== Home-made clouds ==
For the more technologically proficient user a common solution for using a personal cloud is to create a home-made cloud system by connecting an external USB hard drive to a Wi-Fi router. This enables both wired and wireless computers to access the USB hard drive and use it for storage or for retrieving files a user needs to share on the network thereby acting like a cloud.

Setting up a personal cloud requires a user to have particular skills in technology and network setup. One of the risks associated with improper setup is security, and leaving the files accessible to anyone with technical knowledge. Not every router supports this type of access and modification.

== See also ==
- Cloud collaboration
- Cloud computing
- Cloud storage
- File-hosting service
