= New Worlds Project =

Creative writing project

The New Worlds Project is a creative writing project launched in August 2003 to the public after several years of development. The Project centers on an original science fiction setting that enables the creative writing project and its supporting role-playing game. It was co-founded by Alex Perry and Kim Leonard Smouter, and is a registered non-profit corporation in the United States and the European Union.

== Origins ==
The New Worlds Project was inspired by a similar play-by-post game entitled Star Trek: Independence. The game used the Star Trek setting and modified it so as to create a setting compatible with the methods of play-by-post gaming.

The New Worlds Project's co-founders served as administrators within that game and were able to see the strengths and weaknesses of Star Trek: Independence. Also inspired to create a wholly original setting, the administrators inspired themselves from the gameplay of Star Trek: Independence as the basis for their own project.

The co-founders spent two years perfecting their concept, focusing particular attention around their original setting. The Project opened with much fanfare in August 2003 to the public, receiving a hundred applications within a month.

=== Four Seasons of Existence ===
The New Worlds Project catalogues its years of existence by calling each year a season, this borrowing the idea from TV series. In its first "season", 2003–04, New Worlds further expanded its setting and featured its first role-plays. The first generation of role-players brought to life the war-torn setting that had been created by the co-founders.

The second season, 2004–05, was affected by a website domain name change and featured for the first time the "Starport Nuribis Personal Access Network" a full-featured website for just members. The second generation of role-players brought to life Starport Nuribis through numerous civilian storylines that further enriched the original setting. These civilian storylines would be the inspiration for the Season II finale taking place on the civilian Starport Nuribis, featuring a blockade on the symbol of peace.

By the third season, the New Worlds Project continued to professionalise its services, in December 2005 the website was closed in order to upgrade back-end software and further enhance the setting. Re-opening in February 2006, a full-month behind schedule, the Project's website has since returned to service.

A new generation brought with them renewed interest in the main war-torn setting that had been created. As a result, whilst stories involving civilians and civilian storylines became less present, storylines focusing on the war increased sensitively. This renewed interest in military storylines allowed for the Season III finale to be a massive battle between the Gohorns and the Terrans.

In the following year, Season IV, New Worlds Project announced the bifurcation of its game-play between New Worlds: Target Locked and New Worlds: Weapons Free. The bifurcation was motivated by a need to offer new players an easier integration process. The new arrangement has meant that for the first time in the game's history, writing groups are being organised and minimum posting requirements created. The bifurcation was preceded by the implementation of a brand new website which fundamentally changed the navigational structure of the RPG's homepage.

In 2010, the New Worlds Project forums succumbed to inactivity as the administrators encountered offline issues with employment and medical conditions. It remains to be seen if they will be relaunched.

=== New Worlds Project Reboot ===
On 28 September 2013, New Worlds Project's leadership announced plans to reboot the creative community. The community would expand its focus to include writers, graphic artists, and musicians. A new website was to be developed by Corllete Ltd using a heavily modified e107 content management system. The community was to be driven by the 360° Creativity Concept which would allow contributors to the community to be published and earn royalties for their contributions.

Initially the community was slated to come online in November 2013 but development delays led to the public launch date being pushed back to 2 January 2016.

== Setting ==
The New Worlds Project centers on its original science-fiction setting. The setting has evolved since it was launched to the public in 2003 and is continually adapted by both staff and members of the New Worlds Project. The Project's setting is characterized by a rich atmosphere. It is estimated over 1000 pages combined form it.

=== Concept ===
The New Worlds Project's story begins in the 26th century, in the year 2501. Humanity has learned to travel at faster than light speeds safely and has made first contact with a number of alien species. Humanity has united under a single banner, the United Nations governs the Terran Democratic Republic. For almost a century, peace has been administered by the Organisation For Interstellar Peace.

Whilst interstellar peace has been secured, tensions haven't been erased. Indeed, tensions between two major powers: The Gohorn Directorate and the Terran Democratic Republic continue to boil. When the O.I.P. tries to settle a border dispute between the Gohorns and the Humans, it proves unable to resolve differences. War is soon declared.

The O.I.P.'s attempts to stop the spread of the war fail, the Terrans call in their allies the Rosebourg Monarchy further expanding the war so that most of the major powers of the OIP are now engaged. The war has spun out of control and now threatens the sanctity of the Known Galaxy.

As soldiers from a thousand worlds mobilize, peace no longer seems possible – all out war is a reality.

=== Major powers ===
The New Worlds Project's setting centers on a number of major powers that are intricately described on the New Worlds Project's website. The Project features biological information about the species governed under those major powers, as well as social information about these species. The Project also details military and government information about the major powers.

The Major Powers of the setting include the Terran Democratic Republic (Humans), the Gohorn Directorate (Gohorns), the Rosebourg Monarchy (Navaks and Avrans), and the multi-species Luna Minoris Confederacy of Non-Aligned Worlds.

=== Other features ===
The New Worlds Project's setting other features are grouped around the website's Omnipedia. Within the Omnipedia is information about the setting's day-to-day life realities, technical briefings on the vehicles and starships that exist within the setting, as well as definitions of all kinds of terms, organisations, etc.

== Role-playing game ==
The New Worlds Project's setting is used as the basis of a play-by-post role-playing game. It is this role-playing game that opened to the public in August 2003.

The role-playing game counts more than 200 registered users. The setting is used as the backdrop for on-going cooperative writings that feature players' characters struggling to survive combat missions (whether in space or on the ground). Other players have also tried to further expand the setting using civilian characters.

=== External relations ===
The New Worlds Project maintained an office of external relations to govern its relations with other role-playing games.

Under this aegis, the New Worlds Project maintained regular contacts with its partner games via the DragonMuseNetwork (now defunct), a premium partnership of which it was a member. Through the Network it was partnered with Blue Horizon, a New Worlds offshoot, and Tazlure (closed 22 January 2009), an original fantasy role-playing game. New Worlds also maintained a small list of affiliate sites.

New Worlds has had tumultuous relations with the Simming League, a Star Trek role-playing game network. Members of the New Worlds Project voted to withdraw its membership from the League in response to dissatisfaction with the organization. Despite this, in 2004 the League awarded to the project its Internet Technology Prize for unique applications of content management systems.

== Creative writing project ==
The Creative Writing Project also uses the setting as the basis for its works. The creative writing project uses the settings in order to create compatible storylines. Writers can also elect to co-write novels together.

At the time of writing the Creative Writing Project featured two completed full-length novels, and three novels in production. A number of finished role-playing storylines were also billed to become full-length novels.

== Registered non-profit corporation ==
Since Season II, the New Worlds Project's administration team has been working to implement a strategy plan released by Kim Leonard Smouter. The strategy plan hoped to capitalise on New Worlds Project's potential and further advance the unique approach of the administration.

With guidance from Glenn David Gregory, the co-founders drafted by-laws for the New Worlds Project non-profit corporation. These were approved by a founding committee composed of the staff at the time of writing of those by-laws.

The registration process was completed by 4 October 2006, when the authorities in Draper, Utah and Brussels, Belgium granted non-profit corporation status to New Worlds Project in both the United States and the European Union.

The by-laws have now codified New Worlds' mission:

New Worlds Project is organized exclusively for education and literary purposes.

The purpose of this corporation is:

- To improve creative writers’ writing skills by providing internet-based platforms for community-based cooperative writing.
- To facilitate interaction amongst creative writers by providing internet-based platforms for the discussion of all aspects of creative writing.
- To introduce and raise awareness of writers to the methods of “play-by-post role-playing” as a useful tool to improve the quality of creative writing.
- To develop and provide other services and tools to aid the members in writing fiction.

The corporation was initially led by an interim board of directors composed of co-chairs Glenn David Gregory, Alex Perry. Additional members from Belgium, Australia, Canada, and the United Kingdom joined the first permanent Board in December 2006. Initial attempts to secure government funding for the initiative failed, though the corporation successfully trialled the concept in creative writing courses at a community college in Draper, Utah using a sandbox setting called Nalnath. By 2010, however, the corporation went inactive. In 2013, as part of the reboot initiative, the non-profit association was reactivated.

== See also ==
- Creative writing
