= Processed Book Project =

Website

The Processed Book Project is a prototype website and service with customized software tools, launched in November 2005, to explore the evolving nature of books, journals, and other authored content published electronically as digital data, and accessible on a widely connected, often global, network.

== Beginnings ==
Supported by funding from the Hewlett Foundation, the Project grew out of an essay entitled "The Processed Book", published online in the open-access journal FirstMonday in March 2003, by Joseph J. Esposito, former CEO of Encyclopædia Britannica, who in 1994 launched Britannica Online, the first Internet encyclopedia.

The essay proposed that a "processed book" will become "a node in a network, with connections to other books, commentary, online library card catalogues, teachers' recommendations, and so forth"—connections linking both to and from the e-book. Esposito noted that this is very different from the "Romantic myth" of the "primal book...usually written by a single author, someone who has Something to Say".

== Annotations ==
Annotations are one of the main tools of the Processed Book Operating System (PBOS), which allows users to connect "anything that adds lexical, semantic, or procedural value" to a specific segment of a document.

Annotations can include: text notes (which can also have their own annotations); outbound Web links that can be added to a document by someone other than the author or Webmaster; inbound links from other Web sites or e-mail to specific points inside a document, which can be disconnected by the document author without deleting the page they connect to; "BizVantage" links to a proprietary dynamically updated Net "clipping service", driven by "user selected keywords, so that related, external content is discovered and connected to the Book"; and bookmarks placed by the user for quickly returning to points in the document.

In addition, the Project has several document-global tools, including dissect text that "provides extraction, annotation and statistical reporting for both user supplied words/phrases, and for associated words/phrases found via an interface to the WordNet software's extensive catalog of connections among words/phrases."

As an operating system and not simply a vehicle for Web publication, PBOS also provides the ability to add new features or bolt on new computer processes that can be brought to bear on any text stored in the Project library. PBOS is available as open source software at SourceForge. The Project was designed by Lynn Brock and programmed by Wayne Davison.
