= Bourke v. Nissan Motor Co. =

US case upholding employers' right to monitor employees' emails

- Court: California Court of Appeal, Second Appellate District, Division 5
- Full case name: Bonita P. Bourke et al., v. Nissan Motor Corporation in U.S.A.
- Decided: 26 July 1993

Case history
- Prior actions: Bourke v. Nissan Motor Co., No. YC-003979 (Cal. Super. Ct., L.A. Cty. 1992)
- Subsequent action: none

Court membership
- Judge sitting: Douglas A. McKee

Case opinions
- The court ruled that plaintiffs had no reasonable expectation of privacy, and therefore employer had right to monitor employee's E-mail and to terminate employees for using company E-mail system for personal use.

Bourke v. Nissan Motor Corp., No. B068705 (Cal. Ct. App., July 26, 1993), was a California court case in which the Second Appellate District Court of the California Courts of Appeal upheld the original decision of the trial court in favor of the defendant, Nissan Motor Corporation, against the charges of the plaintiffs, who alleged wrongful termination, invasion of privacy, and violation of their constitutional right to privacy, under the California constitution, in connection with Nissan's retrieval, printing, and reading of E-mail messages authored by plaintiffs.

The court ruled that the employer had a right to monitor an employee's E-mail and to terminate employees for sending E-mail of a personal, sexual nature. California's Wiretap and privacy laws did not protect employees from employer monitoring. The Court of Appeal designated this opinion "Not to be published" and it was not reported in the typical opinion reporters.

== Case Background ==
Bonita Bourke and Rhonda Hall were hired by Nissan in June 1989, as Information Systems Specialists at an Infiniti car dealership, serving as customer service representatives for users of the internal computer system.

In June 1990, a co-worker of plaintiffs, Lori Eaton, during a demonstration of the use of E-mail at a training session, randomly selected a message sent by Bourke to an employee of the dealership. The E-mail contained non-business-related content of a highly personal, sexual nature.

This incident was reported to management and many other messages containing personal content involving Bourke and her colleague Hall were later discovered. Following this, written warnings were issued to plaintiffs for violating the company policy prohibiting the use of the company computer system for personal purposes.

During the annual performance review in October 1990, both plaintiffs had received rather low performance ratings (Bourke was rated “needs improvement,” and Hall was rated “unsatisfactory,” second lowest and lowest of six performance level, respectively).

On December 28, 1990, plaintiffs filed grievances with Nissan's human resources department, complaining that the company had invaded their privacy by retrieving and reading their E-mail messages. A few days later, on January 2, 1991, Bourke was given a final warning notice requiring her to improve her performance, while Hall's employment was terminated.

Based upon Nissan's actions in reviewing their E-mail messages as described above, plaintiffs sued Nissan for common law invasion of privacy, violation of their constitutional right to privacy, and violation of California's criminal wiretapping and eavesdropping statutes. They also brought a cause of action for wrongful discharge in violation of public policy (termination in retaliation for the filing of complaints objecting to Nissan's invasion of their privacy).

== Opinion of the Court ==
=== I. Common Law Invasion of Privacy and Violation of Constitutional Right to Privacy ===
Regarding the application of common law vs. constitutional right, the court found that the constitutional right to privacy (stated in California Constitution, Article 1, section 1, "All people are by nature free and independent and have inalienable rights. Among these are enjoying and defending life and liberty, acquiring, possessing, and protecting property, and pursuing and obtaining safety, happiness, and privacy") is broader than, and encompasses, the common law tort of invasion of privacy (see Porten v. University of San Francisco, 64 Cal. App. 3d 825, 829 (Cal. Ct. App. 1976)), thus analysis and discussion was restricted to the constitutional claim.

The critical issues in judging of the violation of an individual's constitutional right to privacy depends first on a determination whether that individual had a personal objectively reasonable expectation of privacy which was infringed (see Alarcon v. Murphy, 201 Cal.App.3d 1, 5 (Cal. Ct. App. 1988) and People ex rel. Franchise Tax Bd. v. Superior Court, 164 Cal.App.3d 526 (Cal. Ct. App. 1985)). The court found that the employees had no reasonable expectation of privacy, citing the following undisputed facts: (1) Plaintiffs each signed a Computer User Registration Form, which states that "[I]t is company policy that employees and contractors restrict their use of company-owned computer hardware and software to company business." (2) The two had been aware for months that E-mail messages were, from time to time, read by individuals other than the intended recipient. (3) In June 1990, a full six months before Bourke's termination, fellow employee, Lori Eaton, had contacted Bourke to complain about the personal, sexual nature of Bourke's E-mail message which Eaton had retrieved for demonstration purposes during a training session at an Infiniti dealership.

Moreover, the fact that plaintiffs were given passwords to access the system and told to safeguard them did not move the court to find their privacy expectations reasonable (see Smyth v. Pillsbury Co., 914 F. Supp. 97 (E.D. Penn. 1996) [the employer's interest in preventing inappropriate communications over its E-Mail system outweighed any privacy interest by those employees who transmitted such communications]).

In the absence of a reasonable expectation of privacy, there can be no violation of the right to privacy (see Alarcon v. Murphy, 201 Cal.App.3d 1, 5 (Cal. Ct. App. 1998)) Therefore, the Court of Appeal held that plaintiffs' causes of actions for common law invasion of privacy and violation of the California constitutional right to privacy were properly dismissed on summary judgment.

=== II. Violation of Penal Code Section 631 ===
Penal Code section 631 prohibits a person from “intentionally tap[ping], or mak[ing] any unauthorized connection . . . with any telegraph or telephone wire, line, cable, or instrument, .. . or . . . read[ing], or attempt[ing] to read, or to learn the contents of any message, report, or communication while the same is in transit or passing over any wire, line or cable . . . .”

The court found that the statute does not apply to the facts of this case, since plaintiffs cited no authority to support their contention that section 631 covers the retrieval, printing and reading of E-mail messages which is not authorized by the author of the message. This decision is based on the fact that (1) There is no allegation that Nissan "tapped" into its own telephone lines, and indeed there would be no need to do so since, being the system operator, Nissan had access to the network without resort to a telephone line tap. (2) Likewise, as the owner and operator of the system, Nissan's connection to the telephone lines or cable which connected the system would necessarily be authorized. And (3) Nissan did not access the messages during transmission. Rather, the messages were retrieved from an electronic storage device and printed so that they could be read. Thus the Court found that Nissan's actions in retrieving, printing and reading plaintiffs' E-mail messages simply were not included within the actions proscribed by California Penal Code section 631.

=== III. Violation of Penal Code Section 632 ===
The court found that section 632 (which prohibits the eavesdropping or recording of a "confidential communication by means of any electronic amplifying or recording device"), does not apply in this case. The reason behind this decision is that: (1) the plain words of the statute simply do not permit a finding that Nissan's conduct violated the law, as no amplifying or recording device was used to retrieve and read plaintiffs' E-mail messages. (2) section 632 proscribes only “the interception of communications by the use of equipment which is not connected to any transmission line” (People v. Ratekin, 212 Cal.App.3d 1165, 1168 (Cal. Ct. App. 1989)), a circumstance not present in this case.

=== IV. Wrongful Discharge in Violation of Public Policy ===
In the absence of an agreement to the contrary, an employee may be terminated at-will, that is, for any reason or for no reason at all (see Foley v. Interactive Data Corp., 47 Cal.3d 654,665 (Cal. 1988)). An employer may not, however, fire an employee for a reason which violates public policy (Ibid; see also Tameny v. Atlantic Richfield, 27 Cal.3d 167, 178 (Cal. 1980); Petermann v. International Brotherhood of Teamsters, 174 Cal.App.2d 184, 188 (Cal. Ct. App. 1959)).

The court argued that a claim for wrongful termination in violation of public policy necessarily requires a violation of public policy; however, as concluded in section I., Nissan's actions in reviewing plaintiffs' E-mail messages did not violate their constitutional right to privacy. Therefore, the Court held that plaintiffs had failed to state a claim for wrongful termination in violation of public policy.

== Summary of Cited Court Cases ==
Alarcon v. Murphy, 201 Cal.App.3d 1 (Cal. Ct. App. 1988): the court held that there is no reasonable expectation of privacy with respect to an individual's criminal record because a criminal record is public information.

Smyth v. Pillsbury, 914 F. Supp. 97 (E.D. Pa., 1996): the court held that there is no reasonable expectation of privacy with respect to e-mails although the employer assured its employees that e-mails will be treated as confidential and would not be used as grounds for termination.

Foley v. Interactive Data Corp., 47 Cal.3d 654, 665 (Cal. 1988): in the absence of an agreement to the contrary, an employee maybe terminated at-will, that is, for any reason or for no reason at all.

Tameny v. Atlantic Richfield, 27 Cal.3d 167, 178 (Cal. 1980) [employee terminated for refusing to engage in price-fixing] and Petermann v. International Brotherhood of Teamsters 174 Cal.App.2d 184, 188 (1959)[employee terminated for refusing to commit perjury]: an employer's general right to terminate an "at-will" employee is 'subject to limits imposed by public policy, since otherwise the threat of discharge could be used to coerce employees into committing crimes, concealing wrongdoing, or taking other action harmful to the public weal.' However, an exception to the general at-will employment presumption is made and a tortious wrongful discharge claim will lie where an employer's termination of an employee violates a fundamental public policy, or in other words, where "he or she is discharged for performing an act that public policy would encourage, or for refusing to do something that public policy would condemn.

== See also ==
- E-mail privacy
- Internet privacy
- Federal Communications Commission
- Workplace Fairness
- Online Privacy Protection Act
- FTC Fair Information Practices
