= GPG Mail =

- Developer: GPGTools GmbH
- Stable release: 7.2 / 23 July 2023
- Operating system: macOS
- Type: Cryptography Software
- License: Trialware
- Website: gpgtools.org

GPG Mail is a commercial extension for Apple Mail which comes as part of GPG Suite, a software collection that provides easy access to a collection of tools designed to secure your communications and encrypt files. GPG Mail provides public key email encryption and signing. It integrates with the default email client Apple Mail under macOS and the actual cryptographic functionality is handled by GNU Privacy Guard.

== History ==
GPG Mail was first released on February 7, 2001, by Stéphane Corthésy. Since 2010 GPG Mail is maintained by GPGTools. While GNU Privacy Guard is free open-source software, use of GPG Mail requires purchase of a support plan.

On September 21, 2018, the developer introduced GPG Mail 3.0 as a part of GPG Suite 2018.4, a new software release that included support for macOS Mojave. In this release, the developer removed the free license option for GPG Mail. A lot of users that relied on automated upgrades were caught by surprise, which prompted a significant backlash from the community. While the licensing change was identified in the release notes for GPG Suite 2018.4, many believed that such a big change required more prominent notifications to avoid the perception of "bait and switch".

In August 2019 the default key server was switched to hagrid, a new verifying key server located at keys.openpgp.org. This improved the quality of search results for public keys and increased control for users over their public keys stored on the server.

On November 24, 2020, GPG Mail 5 was introduced, supporting macOS Mojave, macOS Catalina and macOS Big Sur.

On September 16, 2024, a beta version with support for macOS Sequoia was released.

== See also ==
- Email encryption
- OpenPGP
- End-to-end encryption
- Cryptography
