= Stephen Huntley Watt =

American computer security consultant and hacker

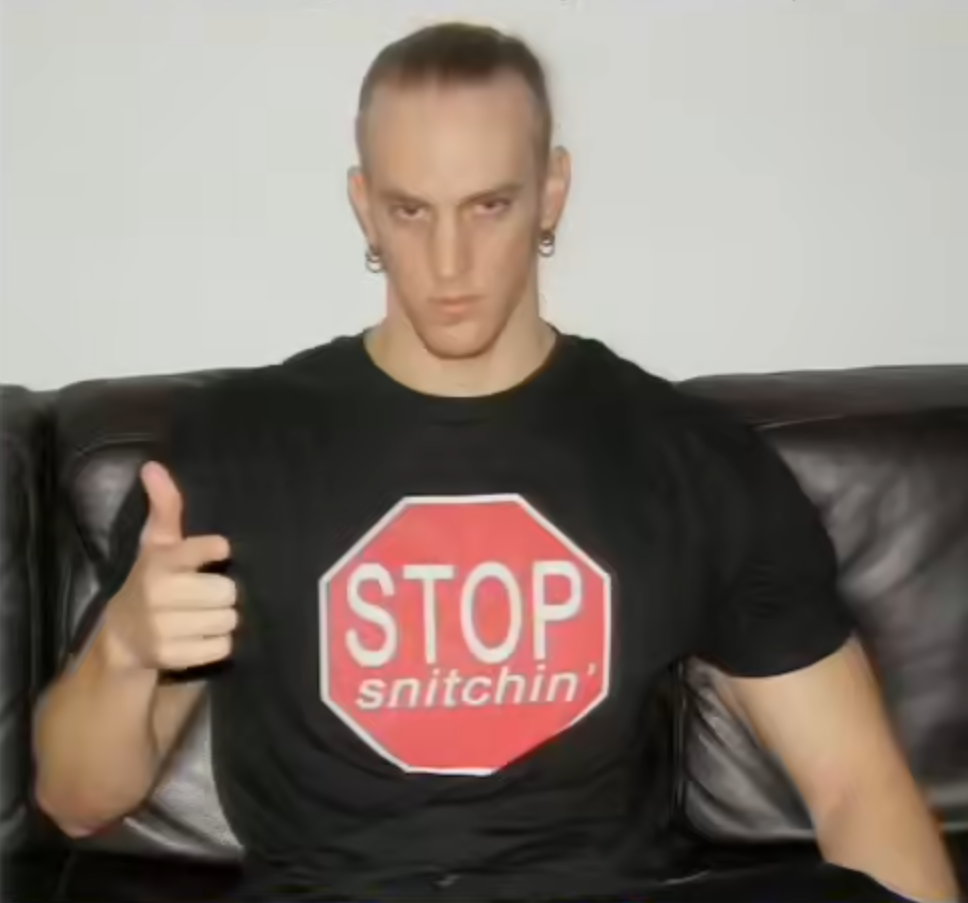
- Born: 1984 (age 41–42)
- Other names: The UNIX Terrorist, JimJones, Stephers Wattson
- Occupations: Information technology consultant (before, hacker)
- Criminal penalty: 2 years in federal prison (2010)
- Website: Stephen Huntley Watt on X

Stephen Huntley Watt (born 1984) is an American computer security consultant and hacker, known for his involvement in the TJX data breach.

After his release from federal prison, he was involved in some security projects, such as the Subgraph OS in 2017.

On August 8, 2014, he and Ladar Levison presented the Dark Internet Mail Environment (DIME) protocol at DEF CON.
