= Lawdex =

Lawdex is a legal-support site specializing in the secure exchange of private documents within the participants of the legal, medical, and insurance industries. As one of its installations, Lawdex operates court e-filing in the state of California. Their site enables attorneys to run a national search for a process server and then immediately expedite service of process, court filing, or record retrieval. Early in the firm's formation they initiated a partnership arrangement with IBM

== Overview ==
First launched at the 2004 E-courts Conference in Las Vegas, Lawdex promotes itself as a replacement for unsecured email, and one of the first online service firms to enable attorneys to both initiate civil lawsuits and court filings from a single web-portal. Their website also enables court document retrieval from all non-federal courts. The firm services courts, law firms, and attorney service firms as a means to auditing document flow over secure networks.

== Demand ==
The American Bar Association best practice standards, state court e-file initiatives, and the Health Insurance Portability and Accountability Act (HIPAA) all appear to be driving demand for greater levels of online accountability within the legal, medical, and insurance industries. More controversially, Lawdex introduced in 2008 a service dubbed "batch filing", allowing law firms to initiate lawsuits in simultaneous batches of a hundred or more over the internet.

== See also ==
- Email Privacy
- Legal Research
- Sarbanes-Oxley Act
