= Dark Mail Alliance =

Organization dedicated to creating email with end-to-end encryption

The Dark Mail Alliance was an organization dedicated to creating an email protocol and architecture with end-to-end encryption.

In October 2013, Silent Circle and Lavabit announced a project to create a more secure alternative to email and began a fundraising effort. The Dark Mail Alliance team originally consisted of Phil Zimmermann, Jon Callas, Mike Janke, and Ladar Levison. As of August 2023, the only original member of the team still listed on the Dark Mail Alliance website is Levison.

== DIME ==
Dark Internet Mail Environment (DIME) aims to be a secure communication platform for asynchronous messaging across the Internet. It was presented by Ladar Levison and Stephen Watt at DEF CON on August 8, 2014.

=== Specifications ===
There have been multiple revisions for DIME specifications. The latest revision is presented as a preliminary draft.

- First public revision, December 2014
- Preliminary draft, March 2015
- Draft, June 2018

=== Protocols ===
- Dark Mail Transfer Protocol (DMTP)
- Dark Mail Access Protocol (DMAP)

=== Data formats ===
- Signet Data Format
- Message Data Format (D/MIME)

=== Implementations ===
==== Server-side ====
Magma is the reference MIME server implementation. It supports server side encryption, Simple Mail Transfer Protocol (SMTP), Post Office Protocol (POP), Internet Message Access Protocol (IMAP) and Hypertext Transfer Protocol (HTTP).

==== Client-side ====
Volcano, a Thunderbird fork with DIME support.

== See also ==
- Email encryption
- Email privacy
- Kolab Now
- Pretty Good Privacy
- pretty Easy privacy
