= Enigmail =

Extension for Mozilla Thunderbird and SeaMonkey

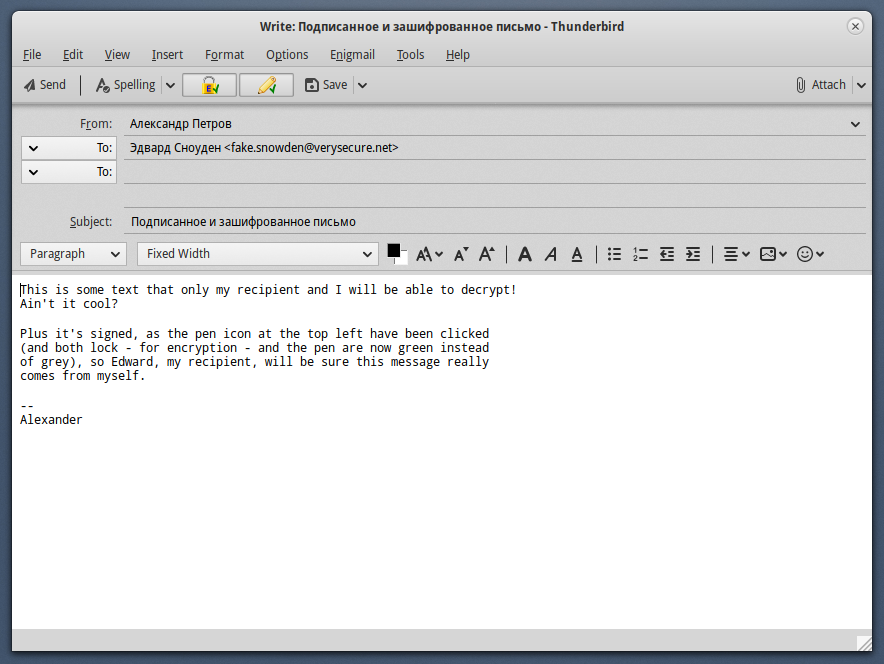
- Signed and encrypted email with Mozilla Thunderbird and Enigmail
- Developer(s): Ramalingam Saravanan (2001-2003) Patrick Brunschwig (2003-present)
- Initial release: November 30, 2009
- Stable release: 3.0 (June 5, 2021; 3 years ago) [±]
- Preview release: 3.0a1 (April 19, 2020; 4 years ago) [±]
- Repository: gitlab.com/enigmail/enigmail
- Written in: JavaScript
- Type: Cryptography
- License: MPL 2.0
- Website: enigmail.net

Enigmail is a data encryption and decryption extension for Mozilla Thunderbird and the Postbox that provides OpenPGP public key e-mail encryption and signing. Enigmail works under Microsoft Windows, Unix-like, and Mac OS X operating systems. Enigmail can operate with other mail clients compatible with PGP/MIME and inline PGP such as: Microsoft Outlook with Gpg4win package installed, Gnome Evolution, KMail, Claws Mail, Gnus, Mutt. Its cryptographic functionality is handled by GNU Privacy Guard.

In their default configuration, Thunderbird and SeaMonkey provide e-mail encryption and signing using S/MIME, which relies on X.509 keys provided by a centralised certificate authority. Enigmail adds an alternative mechanism where cooperating users can instead use keys provided by a web of trust, which relies on multiple users to endorse the authenticity of the sender's and recipient's credentials. In principle this enhances security, since it does not rely on a centralised entity which might be compromised by security failures or engage in malpractice due to commercial interests or pressure from the jurisdiction in which it resides.

Enigmail was first released in 2001 by Ramalingam Saravanan, and since 2003 maintained by Patrick Brunschwig. Both Enigmail and GNU Privacy Guard are free, open-source software. Enigmail with Thunderbird is now the most popular PGP setup.

Enigmail has announced its support for the new "pretty Easy privacy" (p≡p) encryption scheme in a joint Thunderbird extension to be released in December 2015. As of June 2016 the FAQ note it will be available in Q3 2016.

Enigmail also supports Autocrypt exchange of cryptographic keys since version 2.0.

In October 2019, the developers of Thunderbird announced built-in support for encryption and signing based on OpenPGP Thunderbird 78 to replace the Enigmail add-on. The background is a change in the code base of Thunderbird, removing support for legacy add-ons. Since this would require a rewrite from scratch for Enigmail, Patrick Brunschwig instead supports the Thunderbird team in a native implementation in Thunderbird. Enigmail will be maintained for Thunderbird 68 until 6 months after the release of Thunderbird 78. The support of Enigmail for Postbox will be unaffected.

== See also ==
- GNU Privacy Guard
- OpenPGP
