= Werner Koch =

German free software developer (born 1961)

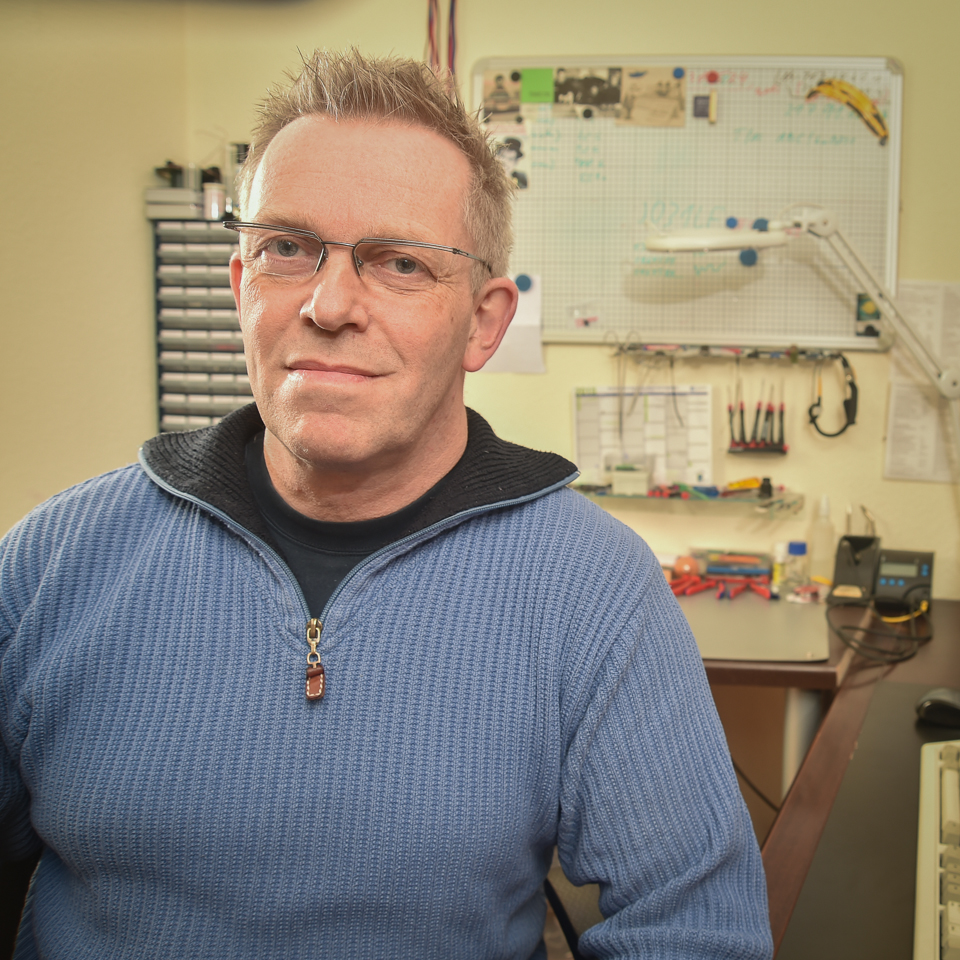
- Koch in 2015
- Born: July 11, 1961 (age 65); Düsseldorf, Germany
- Occupation: Software developer
- Known for: GNU Privacy Guard
- Website: werner.eifzilla.de

Werner Koch (born July 11, 1961) is a German free software developer. He is best known as the principal author of the GNU Privacy Guard (GnuPG or GPG). He was also Head of Office and German Vice-Chancellor of the Free Software Foundation Europe. He is the winner of Award for the Advancement of Free Software in 2015 for founding GnuPG.

Journalists and security professionals rely on GnuPG, and Edward Snowden used it to evade monitoring whilst he leaked classified information from the United States National Security Agency.

== Life and work ==
Koch lives in Erkrath, near Düsseldorf, Germany. He began writing GNU Privacy Guard in 1997, inspired by attending a talk by Richard Stallman who made a call for someone to write a replacement for Phil Zimmermann's Pretty Good Privacy (PGP) which was subject to U.S. export restrictions. The first release of GNU Privacy Guard was in 1999 and it went on to become the basis for most of the popular email encryption programs: GPGTools, Enigmail, and Koch's own Gpg4win, the primary free encryption program for Microsoft Windows.

In 1999 Koch, via the German Unix User Group which he served on the board of, received a grant of 318,000 Deutsche Mark (about US$170,000) from the German Federal Ministry of Economics and Technology to make GPG compatible with Microsoft Windows. In 2005 he received a contract from the German government to support the development of S/MIME.

Journalists and security professionals rely on GnuPG, and Edward Snowden used it to evade monitoring whilst he leaked classified information from the U.S. National Security Agency. Despite GnuPG's popularity, Koch has struggled to survive financially, earning about $25,000 per year since 2001 and thus considered abandoning the project and taking a better paying programming job. However, given Snowden's leaked documents showed the extent of NSA surveillance, Koch continued. In 2014 he held a funding drive and in response received $137,000 in donations from the public, and Facebook and Stripe each pledged to annually donate $50,000 to GPG development. Unrelated, in 2015 Koch was also awarded a one-time grant of $60,000 from the Linux Foundation's Core Infrastructure Initiative.
