= Gpg4win =

Email and file encryption package

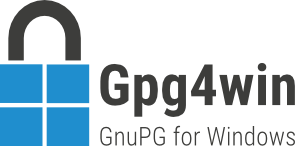
- Developer: The Gpg4win initiative
- Release: April 6, 2006; 20 years ago
- Stable release: 5.1.1 (with GnuPG 2.5.24) (September 23, 2026; 59 days ago) [±]
- Preview release: 5.0.0-beta145 (with GnuPG 2.5.5) (March 10, 2025; 20 months ago) [±]
- Operating system: Windows
- Type: Encryption software
- License: GPLv2+
- Website: gpg4win.org
- Repository: dev.gnupg.org/source/gpg4win/

Gpg4win is an email and file encryption package for most versions of Microsoft Windows and Microsoft Outlook, which utilises the GnuPG framework for symmetric and public-key cryptography, such as data encryption, digital signatures, hash calculations etc.

== History of Gpg4win ==
The original creation of Gpg4win was initiated and funded by Germany's Federal Office for Information Security (BSI) in 2005, resulting in the release of Gpg4win 1.0.0 on 6 April 2006; however Gpg4win and all included tools are free and open source software, and it is typically the non-proprietary option for privacy recommended to Windows users.

As Gpg4win v1 was a much overhauled derivate of GnuPP, both were using GnuPG v1 for cryptographic operations and thus only supported OpenPGP as cryptography standard.

Hence in 2007 the development of a fundamentally enhanced version was started, also with support from the German BSI (Federal Office for Information Security); this effort culminated in the release of Gpg4win 2.0.0 on 7 August 2009 after a protracted beta testing phase, which was based on GnuPG 2.0, included S/MIME support, Kleopatra (software) as a new certificate manager, the Explorer plug-in GpgEX for cryptography operations on files, basic support of smart cards, a full set of German dialogue texts in addition to the English ones, new manuals in English and German, plus many other enhancements.

In contrast to Gpg4win v2, which focused on new features and software components, the development of Gpg4win v3 focused on usability, plus consolidation of code and features: This resulted in the release of Gpg4win 3.0.0 on 19 September 2017 with proper support for Elliptic Curve Cryptography (ECC) by utilising GnuPG 2.2 (instead of 2.0), broadened, stabilised and enhanced smart card support, a fundamentally overhauled Outlook plug-in GpgOL for Outlook 2010 and newer, support of 64-bit versions of Outlook 2010 and newer, supporting dialogues in all languages which KDE supports etc. It is also distributed as GnuPG VS-Desktop with commercial support and approval for handling NATO RESTRICTED, RESTREINT UE/EU RESTRICTED and German VS-NfD documents, which in turn has become the major source of revenue for maintaining and further developing the GnuPG framework and Gpg4win.

Gpg4win 4.0.0, released on 21 December 2021, switched to using GnuPG 2.3 (from 2.2) and continued to refine and enhance the feature set of Gpg4win v3.

== Contents of Gpg4win Installer ==
- GnuPG: the core cryptography framework
- Certificate managers
  - Kleopatra (software): certificate manager for OpenPGP and X.509
  - GPA: an alternative certificate manager (GNU) for OpenPGP and X.509
- Plug-ins for email and file cryptography
  - GpgOL: a plug-in for Microsoft Outlook to provide email encryption and signing
  - GpgEX: a plug-in for the Windows Explorer to provide file encryption, signing and hash calculations
- Gpg4win Compendium: an introduction to encryption (OpenPGP and X.509) and user manual for Gpg4win

== See also ==
- E-mail privacy
