= SyncEvolution =

- Developer(s): Patrick Ohly
- Initial release: 2006
- Stable release: 2.0.0 / March 21, 2021; 4 years ago
- Repository: anongit.freedesktop.org/SyncEvolution/syncevolution
- Written in: C++
- Operating system: Linux, Mac OS X
- Size: 11 MB
- Available in: 26 languages
- Type: SyncML
- License: GNU Lesser General Public License
- Website: syncevolution.org

SyncEvolution synchronizes Evolution's contact, calendar and task items via SyncML. The items are exchanged in the vCard 2.1 or 3.0 format and iCalendar 2.0 format via the Synthesis C++ client API library, which should make SyncEvolution compatible with the majority of SyncML servers. Full, one-way and incremental synchronization of items are supported.

SyncEvolution synchronizes personal information management (PIM) data such as contacts, appointments, tasks and memos using the Synthesis sync engine, which provides support for the SyncML synchronization protocol.

SyncEvolution synchronizes with SyncML servers over HTTP and with SyncML capable phones locally over Bluetooth/OBEX. Plugins provide access to the data which is to be synchronized. Binaries are available for Linux desktops (synchronizing data in GNOME Evolution, with KDE supported indirectly already and Akonadi support in development), for MeeGo and for Maemo 5/Nokia N900. The source code can be compiled for Unix-like systems and provides a framework to build custom SyncML clients or servers.
