= Pretty Easy Privacy =

Data encryption and verification system

- Developers: p≡p Foundation (Switzerland), p≡p Security AG (Switzerland), p≡p Security SA (Luxembourg)
- Release: July 4, 2016
- Written in: ASN.1, C, C#, C++, Objective-C, Java, JavaScript, Python, Swift, SQL, YML2
- Type: Data encryption
- License: GNU General Public License
- Website: www.pep.security
- Repository: gitea.pep.foundation/pEp.foundation

Pretty Easy Privacy (stylized as pretty Easy privacy or p≡p) was a pluggable data encryption and verification system that provided automatic cryptographic key management through a set of libraries for written digital communications.

It existed as a plugin for Microsoft Outlook and Mozilla Thunderbird as well as a mobile app for Android and iOS. PEP also worked under Microsoft Windows, Unix-like and Mac OS X operating systems. Its cryptographic functionality was handled by an open-source PEP engine relying on already existing cryptographic implementations in software like GnuPG, a modified version of netpgp (used only in iOS), and (as of PEP v2.0) GNUnet.

Pretty Easy Privacy was first released in 2016. It is a free and open-source software.

PEP was advertised as being easy to install, use, and understand. PEP did not depend on any specific platform, message transport system (SMS, email, XMPP, etc.), or centrally provided client–server or "cloud" infrastructures; PEP is fully peer-to-peer by design.

Keys are exchanged opportunistically by transferring via email.

== Enigmail support ==
Enigmail announced its support for Pretty Easy Privacy encryption in a joint Thunderbird extension to be released in December 2015. Patrick Brunschwig, the head of Enigmail, announced that PEP core functionality was implemented in Enigmail in October 2016, ready for the Mozilla Festival then taking place in London.

In July 2020, Thunderbird 78 dropped support for the Enigmail Add-On. Thunderbird 78 includes OpenPGP functionality and no longer requires the installation of external software.

== ISOC support ==
The Internet Society Switzerland Chapter (ISOC-CH) and the Swiss PEP foundation teamed up to implement privacy-enhancing standards at the basic level of internet protocols, and document them in the work of the Internet Engineering Task Force (IETF).

== Controversy and Closure ==
In March 2021, reports surfaced that PEP had paid for fake reviews for their apps.

As of January 2024, the company overseeing PEP is not operational. Its website no longer functions, and development of the system has ceased.

== See also ==
- GNU Privacy Guard
- Pretty Good Privacy
