= GNOME Keyring =

Linux password management software

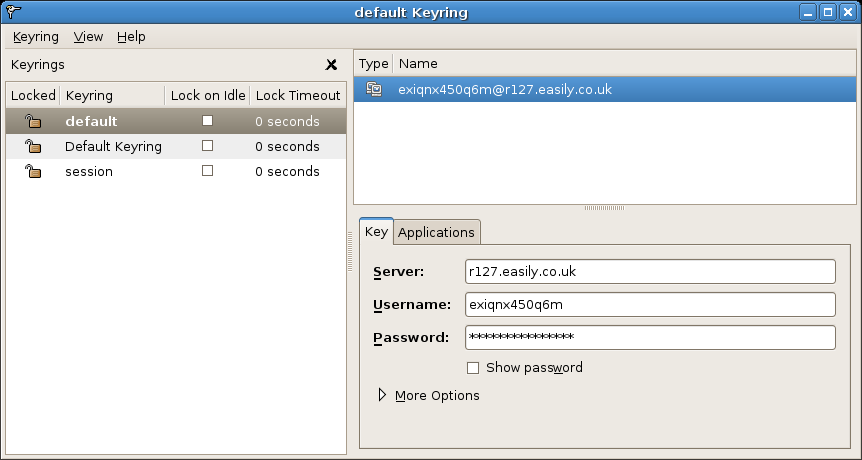
- GNOME Keyring Manager 2.12.1
- Release: 2003
- Stable release: 50.0 / 16 March 2026; 5 months ago
- Written in: C
- Type: Password manager; Linux on the desktop
- License: GPL-2.0-or-later
- Website: wiki.gnome.org/Projects/GnomeKeyring
- Repository: gitlab.gnome.org/GNOME/gnome-keyring

GNOME Keyring is a software application designed to store security credentials such as usernames, passwords, and keys, together with a small amount of relevant metadata. The sensitive data is encrypted and stored in a keyring file in the user's home directory. The default keyring uses the login password for encryption, so users don't need to remember another password.

As of 2009, GNOME Keyring was part of the desktop environment in the operating system OpenSolaris.

GNOME Keyring is implemented as a daemon and uses the process name gnome-keyring-daemon. Applications can store and request passwords by using the libsecret library which replaces the deprecated libgnome-keyring library.

GNOME Keyring is part of the GNOME desktop. As of 2006, it integrated with NetworkManager to store WEP passwords. GNOME Web and the email client Geary uses GNOME Keyring to store passwords.

On systems where GNOME Keyring is present, software written in Vala can use it to store and retrieve passwords. The GNOME Keyring Manager (gnome-keyring-manager) was the first user interface for the GNOME Keyring. As of GNOME 2.22, it is deprecated and replaced entirely with Seahorse.

== See also ==
- List of password managers
- KWallet, the KDE equivalent
- Apple Keychain
- NetworkManager
- Seahorse (software)
