= Postbox (email client) =

Desktop email client, 2008–2024

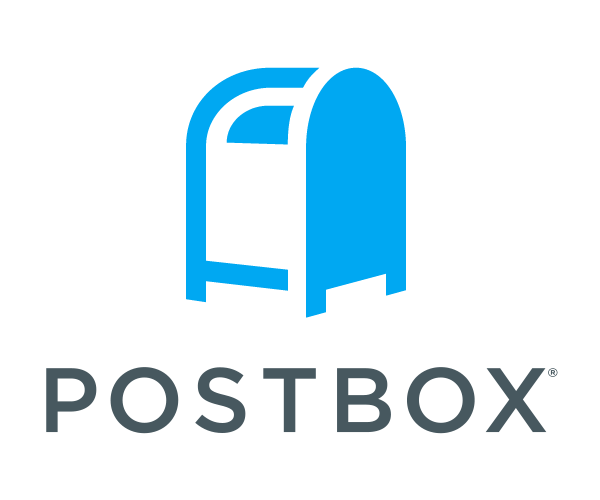
- Developers: Postbox, Inc.
- Release: September 9, 2008; 18 years ago
- Final release: 7.0.64 / 2024
- Operating system: Windows, macOS
- Successor: eM Client
- Available in: 10 languages
- List of languages US English, with community translations into German, French, Spanish (Spain), English (British), Italian, Dutch, Portuguese (Brazilian), Russian, and Swedish
- Type: Email client, news client, feed reader
- License: Proprietary
- Website: www.postbox-inc.com

Postbox is a desktop email client, news client and feed reader for Windows and macOS. Written and sold by Postbox, Inc., it was launched at the TechCrunch 50 conference in 2008. On 22 October 2024 it was announced that Postbox had been acquired by the makers of eM Client, and that the Postbox email client would no longer be sold or developed.

Postbox was founded and staffed by several former developers from Mozilla. The software was built using Mozilla's Gecko browser engine, and was initially based on Thunderbird, Mozilla's own e-mail software.

According to a 2017 report, Postbox 7 required 8GB of RAM, 200 MB of hard drive space, plus Windows 8 (or later) or macOS 10.13 (or later). The Windows version ran in 32-bit-mode on 32-bit and 64-bit systems.
