= Workplace Fairness =

Public education and advocacy organization

- Abbreviation: WF
- Established: 1994; 32 years ago
- Type: Nonprofit
- Legal status: 501(c)(3)
- Headquarters: World Building; 8121 Georgia Avenue; Suite 600; Silver Spring, Maryland 20910
- Location: United States
- Coordinates: 38.9910855°N 77.0286729°W
- Methods: Education, litigation, advocacy
- Field: Labor rights
- Executive Director: Edgar Ndjatou
- Engagement Director: Alayya Arrison
- Board President: Wayne Outten
- Board Treasurer: Shannon E. Rusz
- Publication: Today's Workplace blog
- Website: www.workplacefairness.org
- Formerly called: National Employee Rights Institute (NERI)

Workplace Fairness is a 501(c)(3) public education and advocacy organization, founded in 1994 as the National Employee Rights Institute.

In 2004 PC Magazine named Workplace Fairness's website as one of the "100 Top Websites You Didn't Know You Couldn't Live Without". The website features articles on employment law issues, including overtime, discrimination, retaliation, privacy and whistleblower rights. "Today's Workplace", the Workplace Fairness blog, features daily updates on employee rights and fairness issues. According to the blog, Forbes magazine listed it as one of the "Best of the Web" in 2005.

Workplace Fairness publishes books on the rights of federal employees in the United States and the Employee Rights and Employment Policy Journal.
