= Signed and Encrypted Email Over The Internet =

The Signed and Encrypted Email Over the Internet (SEEOTI) initiative is an approach to providing small and medium enterprises with the ability to communicate securely with one another, government defence ministries and major aerospace and defence contractors, allowing them to play a full part in the defence supply chain.

== Overview ==
SEEOTI implements the secure email specifications defined by the Transglobal Secure Collaboration Program (TSCP). These support interoperable signing and encryption of email messages in a federated environment. In addition, the security labelling of email messages is supported with a network border guard being able to check labels even though messages are encrypted. This meets the goal of protecting Intellectual Property in the global business environment, which is of particular importance to the UK Cyber Security Strategy as intellectual property is seen as key to the growth of the economy.

Deep-Secure organised a trial of SEEOTI for UK MOD and the UK Council for Electronic Business. This integrated Commercial Off The Shelf (COTS) products from TITUS, Boldon James and Deep-Secure to provide the system's email security functionality. Deep-Secure were selected as the overall winner of the UKCeB Excellence Awards 2011 for their work on SEEOTI in February 2012. Deep-Secure and its partners Adept4, Intercede and Trustis are providing a SEEOTI solution as a service. Nexor provide compatible products.
