= KGPG =

Graphical front-end for GPG

KGpg

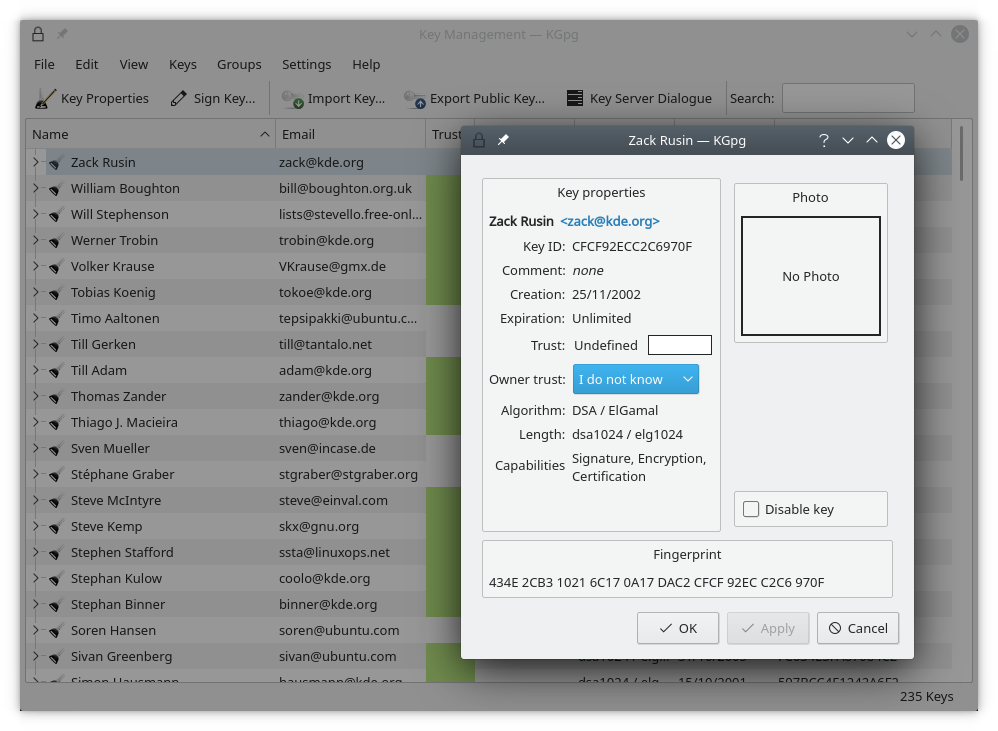
- Developer: KDE
- Stable release: 25.04.1 / May 8, 2025
- Repository: anongit.kde.org/kgpg.git
- Platform: Cross-platform
- Type: GPG frontend
- License: GPL-2.0-or-later
- Website: KGpg on utils.kde.org

KGpg is a graphical frontend to GnuPG for KDE, which includes a key management window and an editor. Users can create cryptographic keys, and write, encrypt, decrypt, sign, or verify messages. When integrated with the Konqueror browser/file manager, users can encrypt files by right-clicking and choosing Actions > Encrypt File. Left-clicking on an encrypted file in Konqueror will prompt the user for a password to decrypt the file. The user can make public or private keys, and can export/import keys. A user can sign the keys, and set an expiration date.
