= Smyth v. Pillsbury Co. =

Michael A. Smyth v. The Pillsbury Company, 914 F. Supp. 97 (E.D. Pa. 1996) was decided on January 18, 1996, in the United States District Court for the Eastern District of Pennsylvania. Michael A. Smyth was a regional operations manager at the Pillsbury Company. Smyth had a company email account that he was able to access from work and home. Pillsbury, on multiple occasions, told its employees that all email communications were private, confidential, and that there was no danger of the messages being intercepted and used as grounds for discipline or termination.

In October 1994, while at home, Smyth received emails from his supervisor and, thinking that his replies would not be intercepted or used against him, made threatening comments. Pillsbury intercepted the emails and, despite the previous assurances made to the employees, terminated him. Smyth brought a wrongful discharge suit against Pillsbury, claiming that his right to privacy had been violated when his emails were intercepted.

== Ruling of the court ==
Judge Charles R. Weiner presided over the trial and authored the court's opinion. The decision was based on an examination of the common law exceptions to Pennsylvania's denial of a cause of action for the termination of an at-will employee. The court looked to the cases that stated a cause of action exists only where the termination of an at-will employee threatens or violates a clear mandate of public policy. Quoting an earlier Third Circuit decision, Judge Weiner defined a violation of a clear mandate of public policy as something that "strikes at the heart of a citizen's social right, duties and responsibilities." Using this framework, the court evaluated Smyth's claim that his termination was based on a violation of his common law right to privacy and even went as far as to infer and analyze an argument based on estoppel. The court was not persuaded by the arguments and granted Pillsbury's motion to dismiss.

== Analysis ==
=== Exceptions to employer's right to terminate an at-will employee ===
The Smyth decision reviewed the three exceptions to Pennsylvania's rule denying a wrongful discharge cause of action for at-will employees. An exception is only created when the termination of the employee threatens or violates a clear mandate of public policy. The three exceptions are: an employee may not be fired for serving jury duty, employment may not be denied to a person with a prior conviction, and an employee may not be terminated for reporting federal regulation violations to the Nuclear Regulatory Commission. The court stressed that public policy, without legislative guidance, must be determined on a case-by-case basis and is found in administrative rules, regulations, and judicial decisions.

=== Smyth's privacy argument ===
Smyth's assertion that his firing was a public policy violation was based on the court's decision in the Borse case. In Borse, the court found that, while an employer's firing of an employee for refusing to take a urinalysis test was not violating public policy under the Pennsylvania or United States' constitutions, it may have been a tortious invasion of privacy, a violation of Pennsylvania law. According to the Restatement (Second) of Torts § 652B, the tort of intrusion upon seclusion is:

One who intentionally intrudes, physically or otherwise, upon the solitude or seclusion of another or his private affairs or concerns, is subject to liability to the other for invasion of his privacy, if the intrusion would be highly offensive to a reasonable person.

The Borse court added to the Restatement's standard, stating that a party would only be held liable when the "intrusion is substantial" and "highly offensive to the ordinary reasonable person." The court set forth a simple balancing test in order to determine whether the invasion of privacy was substantial and highly offensive, weighing the employer's interest in keeping the workplace drug-free against the employee's privacy interest. Borse was remanded to allow the plaintiff to amend her complaint as there appeared to be a cause of action.

In Smyth, the court found that even if an employer assures its employees that emails will not be intercepted, there is not a reasonable expectation of privacy in voluntary email communication through the company email system. The court distinguished this case from Borse on the facts that the Smyth's person and personal property were not searched and he was not required by Pillsbury to disclose any personal information. The court went on to hold that, even if there was an expectation of privacy in Smyth's emails, a reasonable person would not consider their interception a substantial and highly offensive invasion of privacy. Performing the balancing test that was set out in Borse, they found that Pillsbury's interest in preventing unprofessional or illegal activity on their email system outweighed any privacy interest that Smyth might have had in his messages.

=== Smyth's estoppel argument ===
In a footnote, the court addressed a claim that was not formally alleged in any of his pleadings. The court suggested that Smyth was alleging that there should be an exception to Pennsylvania's rule denying a wrongful discharge cause of action for at-will employees (based on estoppel) since Pillsbury had told Smyth and the other employees that their emails would not be intercepted and used as a basis for punishment and they had relied on those assurances to their detriment. This argument was dismissed, as the law in Pennsylvania is that an employer is not bound by estoppel when terminating employees, even when it can be shown that a promise was made and relied upon.

== Implications ==
The Smyth decision has been followed in many different jurisdictions. The basic principle set forth, that employees do not have a privacy interest in their company emails, is the majority rule. An employee may have a reasonable expectation of privacy in emails sent from a private account using an employee's computer. For example, The Supreme Court of New Jersey found that there is a privacy interest in an employee's email communications with their attorney, via a private account, that outweighs an employer's interest in preventing unprofessional or illegal activity.
