= GNOME Evolution =

Personal information manager for the GNOME desktop environment

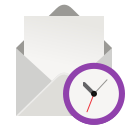

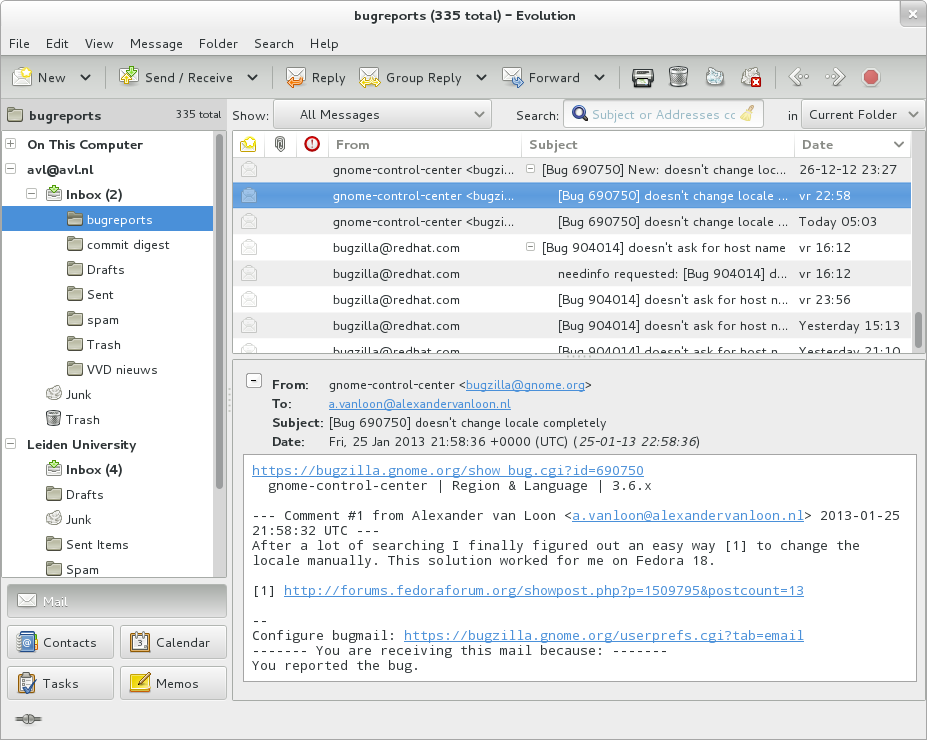
- Evolution 3.6; September 2012
- Original author: Ximian
- Developer: GNOME Project
- Release: 10 May 2000; 26 years ago
- Stable release: 3.62.1 / 9 October 2026
- Written in: C (GTK)
- Operating system: Unix-like
- Available in: 53 languages
- List of languages English, Portuguese (Brazilian), Russian, Slovenian, Ukrainian
- Type: Personal information manager
- License: LGPL 2.1 only (Note: LGPL-2.1-only or LGPL-3.0-only) and others
- Website: gitlab.gnome.org/GNOME/evolution/-/wikis/home
- Repository: gitlab.gnome.org/GNOME/evolution

GNOME Evolution (formerly Novell Evolution and Ximian Evolution, before Novell acquired Ximian in 2003) is the official personal information manager for GNOME. It has been an official part of GNOME since Evolution 2.0 was included with the GNOME 2.8 release in September 2004. It combines email, address book, calendar, task list, and note-taking features. Its user interface and functions are similar to Microsoft Outlook. Evolution is free software licensed under the terms of the GNU Lesser General Public License (LGPL).

== Features ==
Evolution

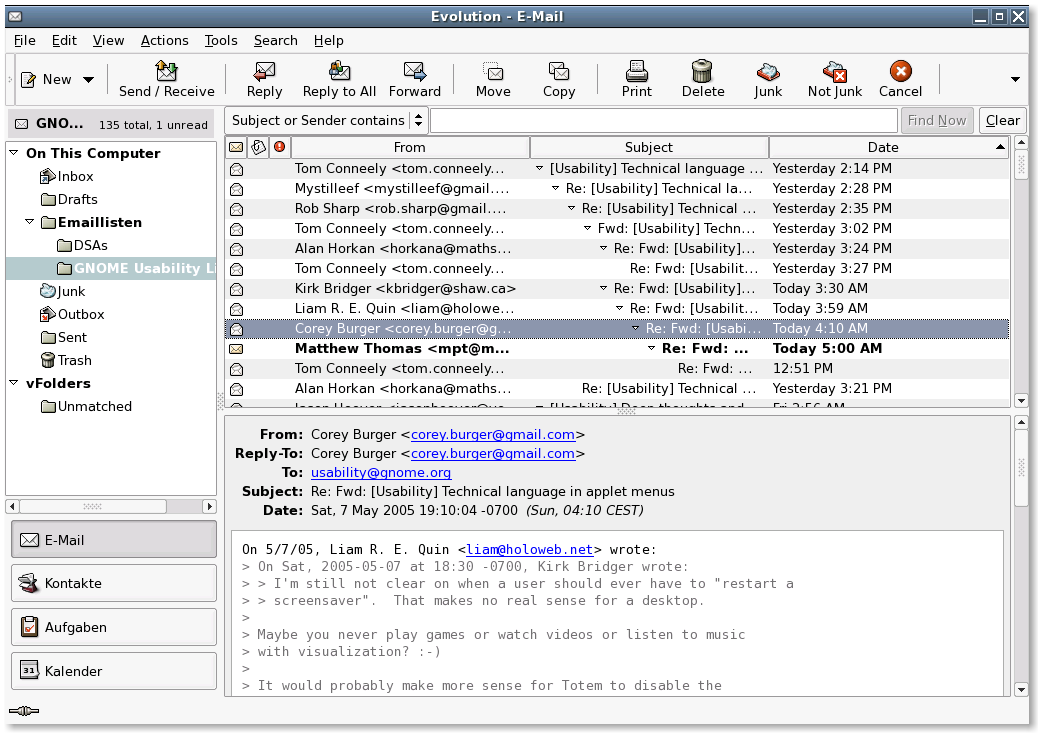
Older version

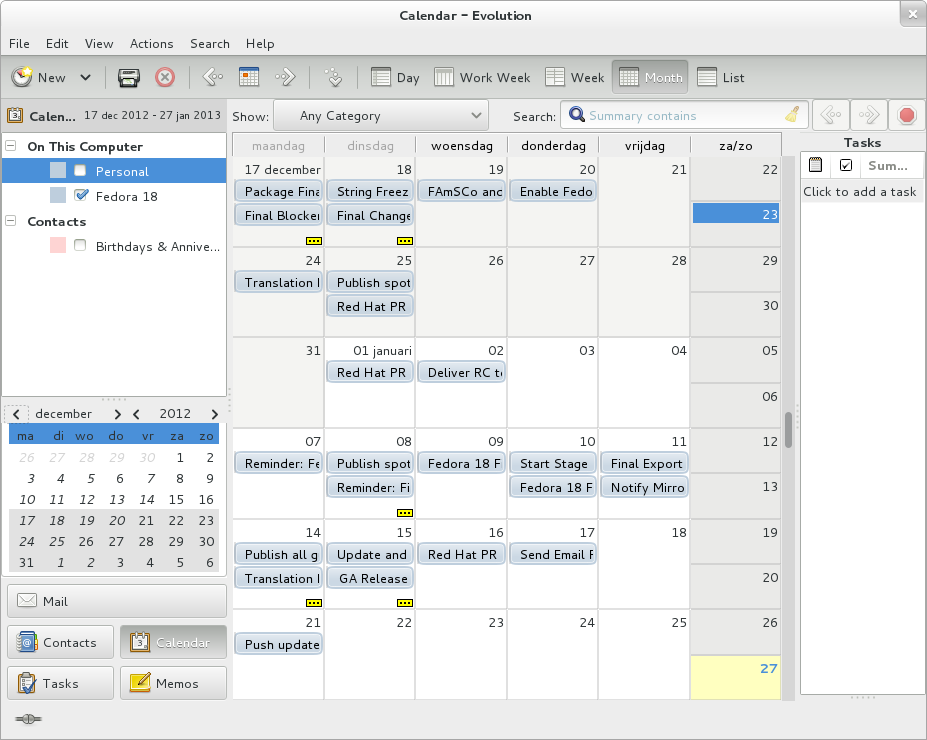
Calendar function

Evolution delivers the following features:

- Email retrieval with the Post Office Protocol (POP) and Internet Message Access Protocol (IMAP) protocols and email transmission with Simple Mail Transfer Protocol (SMTP);
- Secure network connections encrypted with Transport Layer Security (SSL, TLS), and STARTTLS;
- Email encryption with GNU Privacy Guard (GPG) and Secure/Multipurpose Internet Mail Extensions (S/MIME);
- Markdown email formatting;
- Email filters;
- Search folders: saved searches that look like normal mail folders as an alternative to using filters and search queries;
- Automatic spam filtering with SpamAssassin and Bogofilter;
- Connectivity to Microsoft Exchange Server, Novell GroupWise and Kolab (provided in separate packages as plug-ins);
- Calendar support for the iCalendar file format, the WebDAV and CalDAV standards and Google Calendar;
- Contact management with local address books, CardDAV, LDAP and Google address books;
- Synchronization via SyncML with SyncEvolution and with Palm OS devices via gnome-pilot;
- Address books that can be used as a data source in LibreOffice;
- User avatars loading from address book, email headers X-Face, Face or automatic lookup by hashed email address from Gravatar service;
- An RSS reader plug-in;
- A news client;
- Import from Microsoft Outlook archives (dbx, pst) and Berkeley Mailbox.

The Novell GroupWise plug-in is no longer in active development. A Scalix plug-in is also available, but its development stopped in 2009.

=== Evolution Data Server ===
Evolution Data Server (EDS) is a set of libraries and session services for storing address books and calendars. Other software such as California and GNOME Calendar depends on EDS also.

Some documentation about the software architecture is available in the GNOME wiki.

=== Connecting to Microsoft Exchange Server ===
Depending on which version of Microsoft Exchange Server is used, different packages need to be installed to be able to connect to it. The documentation recommends the evolution-ews package (which uses Exchange Web Services) for Exchange Server 2007, 2010 and newer. If evolution-ews does not work well, it is advised to try the evolution-mapi package. This supports Exchange Server 2010, 2007 and possibly older versions supporting Messaging Application Programming Interface (MAPI). For Exchange Server 2003, 2000 and possibly earlier versions supporting Outlook Web App the package evolution-exchange is recommended.

== History ==
Ximian decided to develop Evolution in 2000. It felt there were no email clients for Linux at the time that could provide the functionality and interoperability necessary for corporate users. Ximian saw an opportunity for Linux to penetrate the corporate environment if the right enterprise software was available for it. It released Evolution 1.0 in December 2001 and offered the paid Ximian Connector plug-in which allowed users to connect with Microsoft Exchange Server. Evolution itself has been free software from the start, but Ximian Connector was sold as proprietary software so that Ximian could generate revenue. This changed after Novell's acquisition of Ximian in August 2003. Novell decided to integrate the Exchange plug-in as free software in Evolution 2.0 in May 2004.

Novell was in turn acquired by The Attachmate Group in 2011. It transferred Novell's former Evolution developers to its subsidiary SUSE. In 2012 SUSE decided to stop its funding of Evolution's development and assigned its developers elsewhere. As a consequence only two full-time developers employed by Red Hat remained. Later in 2013 Red Hat dedicated more developers to the project, reinvigorating its development. The reasons given for the decision were the cessation of active development on Mozilla Thunderbird and the need for an email client with good support for Microsoft Exchange.

== Distribution ==
As a part of GNOME, Evolution is released as source code. Linux distributions provide packages of GNOME for end-users. Evolution is used as the default personal information manager on several Linux distributions which use GNOME by default, most notably Debian and Fedora. Ubuntu has replaced Evolution with Mozilla Thunderbird as the default email client since Ubuntu 11.10 Oneiric Ocelot.

=== Defunct Mac OS X and Windows ports ===
In the past, Evolution was ported to Apple Mac OS X and Microsoft Windows, but these ports are discontinued.

In 2006, Novell released an installer for Evolution 2.6 on Mac OS X. In January 2005, Novell's Nat Friedman announced in his blog that the company had hired Tor Lillqvist, the programmer who ported GIMP to Microsoft Windows, to do the same with Evolution. Before this announcement, several projects with the same goal had been started but none of them reached alpha status. In 2008, DIP Consultants released a Windows installer for Evolution 2.28.1-1 for Microsoft Windows XP and newer. As of 2025, it is available for download from only the SourceForge project page.

A slightly more recent (2010–2011) experimental installer for Evolution 3.0.2 is provided by openSUSE. Users have faced difficulties getting this version working.

== See also ==
- Geary – another email client for GNOME
- List of personal information managers
- Comparison of email clients
