= United States v. Kirschner =

Legal case

- Court: United States District Court for the Eastern District of Michigan
- Full case name: United States of America v. Thomos J. Kirschner
- Citation: 823 F. Supp. 2d 665 (E.D. Mich. 2010)

Holding
- Requiring a defendant to divulge the password to an encrypted file in response to a grand jury subpoena would violate his Fifth Amendment right not to incriminate himself.

Court membership
- Judge sitting: Paul D. Borman

Keywords
- encryption, self-incrimination

United States v. Kirschner, 823 F. Supp. 2d 665 (E.D. Mich. 2010), was a federal criminal case in Michigan. The defendant had previously been indicted by a grand jury under three counts of receipt of child pornography under 18 U.S.C. § 2252A(a)(2)(A). The government sought to use a grand jury subpoena post-indictment to acquire additional evidence: the contents of an encrypted file from the defendant's hard drive.

== Decision of the United States District Court ==
On March 30, 2010, Judge Paul D. Borman held that compelling Kirschner to divulge the password to the encrypted file would require "producing specific testimony asserting a fact" in violation of his Fifth Amendment right against self-incrimination.

== See also ==
- In re
- Key disclosure law
- United States v. Hubbell, 530 U.S. 27 (2000)
- In re Boucher
- United States v. Fricosu
