= XRY =

XRY may refer to:

- Jerez Airport in Jerez de la Frontera, Spain
- XRY (software), a forensic software which examines mobile devices
- Extinction Rebellion Youth, an environmental advocacy youth group
