= Chris Wade (entrepreneur) =

Australian-American security researcher

Chris Wade is an Australian-American computer security researcher and technology entrepreneur. He co-founded Corellium and has been chief technology officer of the digital forensics company Cellebrite since it acquired Corellium in December 2025.

In 2005, he was arrested in Texas in connection with software he had developed that was used for sending spam. He later worked as a technical consultant to the U.S. Secret Service and Federal Bureau of Investigation and received a presidential pardon from Donald Trump in December 2020.

== Biography ==
Wade grew up outside Murwillumbah in rural New South Wales. Wade moved to the United States at age 21. While awaiting a work visa, he was commissioned to develop software that routed email through intermediary computers; the software was later used to distribute spam advertising financial scams. In 2005, the U.S. Secret Service raided his home in Dallas and arrested him. Wade pleaded guilty and assisted federal investigators with technical investigations. He was sentenced in 2012 to two years' probation and a fine of approximately US$70,000 and served no prison time. He later worked as a technical consultant for the Secret Service and FBI, including with the FBI's New York field office on password cracking, data analysis, the Silk Road investigation, and cases involving Anonymous. He received a presidential pardon from Donald Trump in December 2020 and became a U.S. citizen.

== Career ==
Wade began working on iPhone security in the late 2000s and developed jailbreak tools under the alias “cmw,” including WinPwn. In 2011, he founded iEmu, an open-source project for iOS device emulation. In 2014, he co-founded Virtual, a company developing mobile-device virtualization technology; Citrix acquired the company that year.

In 2017, Wade co-founded Corellium and served as its chief technology officer. The company's platform enabled virtualized iOS and Android devices to be run on ARM-based server hardware for software development and security research. Apple sued Corellium in 2019 over its reproduction of iOS. A federal court ruled in 2020 that Corellium's use of iOS constituted fair use; the remaining claims were settled in 2023.

In June 2025, Cellebrite announced its acquisition of Corellium, which was completed in December 2025. Following the acquisition, Wade joined Cellebrite as chief technology officer.
