= Mobile device forensics =

Recovery of evidence from mobile devices

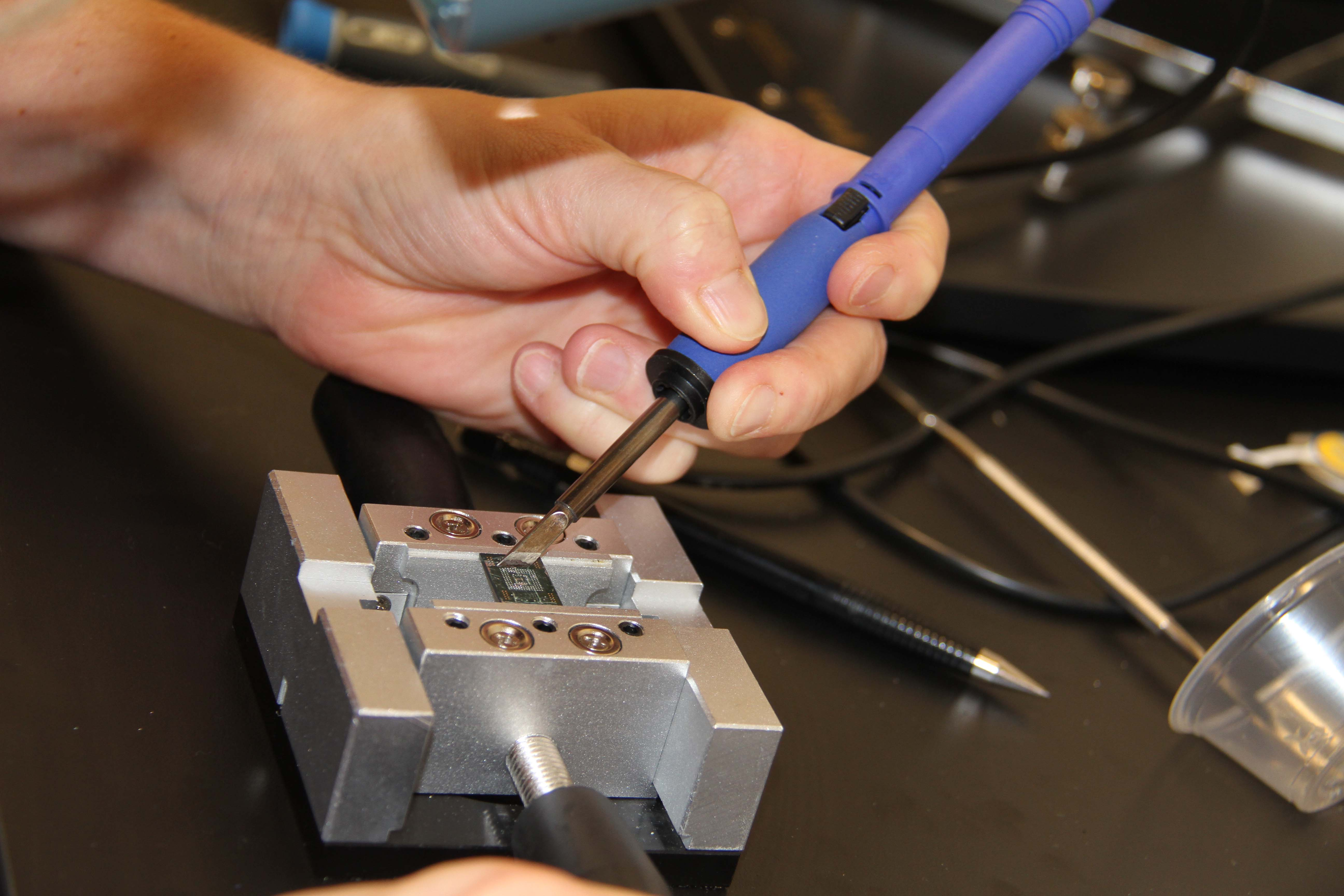
A forensic expert examining a mobile device that was seized during an investigation

Mobile device forensics is a branch of digital forensics relating to recovery of digital evidence or data from a mobile device under forensically sound conditions. The phrase mobile device usually refers to mobile phones; however, it can also relate to any digital device that has both internal memory and communication ability, including PDA devices, GPS devices and tablet computers.

Mobile devices can be used to save several types of personal information such as contacts, photos, calendars and notes, SMS and MMS messages. Smartphones may additionally contain video, email, web browsing information, location information, and social networking messages and contacts.

There is growing demand for mobile forensics due to several reasons and some of the prominent reasons are:

- Use of mobile phones to store and transmit personal and corporate information
- Use of mobile phones in online transactions
- Use of mobile phone devices by criminals

Mobile device forensics can be particularly challenging on a number of levels:

Evidential and technical challenges exist. For example, cell site analysis following from the use of a mobile phone usage coverage is not an exact science. Consequently, whilst it is possible to determine roughly the cell site zone from which a call was made or received, it is not yet possible to say with any degree of certainty that a mobile phone call emanated from a specific location e.g. a residential address.

- To remain competitive, original equipment manufacturers frequently change mobile phone form factors, operating system file structures, data storage, services, peripherals, and even pin connectors and cables. As a result, forensic examiners must use a different forensic process compared to computer forensics.
- Storage capacity continues to grow thanks to demand for more powerful "mini computer" type devices.
- Not only the types of data but also the way mobile devices are used constantly evolve.
- Hibernation behavior in which processes are suspended when the device is powered off or idle, but at the same time remaining active.

As a result of these challenges, a wide variety of tools exists to extract evidence from mobile devices; no one tool or method can acquire all the evidence from all devices. It is therefore recommended that forensic examiners, especially those wishing to qualify as expert witnesses in court, undergo extensive training in order to understand how each tool and method acquires evidence; how it maintains standards for forensic soundness; and how it meets legal requirements such as the Daubert standard or Frye standard.

== History ==
As a field of study, forensic examination of mobile devices dates from the late 1990s and early 2000s. The role of mobile phones in crime had long been recognized by law enforcement. With the increased availability of such devices on the consumer market and the wider array of communication platforms they support (e.g. email, web browsing) demand for forensic examination grew.

Early efforts to examine mobile devices used similar techniques to the first computer forensics investigations: analyzing phone contents directly via the screen and photographing important content. However, this proved to be a time-consuming process, and as the number of mobile devices began to increase, investigators called for more efficient means of extracting data. Enterprising mobile forensic examiners sometimes used cell phone or PDA synchronization software to "back up" device data to a forensic computer for imaging, or sometimes, simply performed computer forensics on the hard drive of a suspect computer where data had been synchronized. However, this type of software could write to the phone as well as reading it, and could not retrieve deleted data.

Some forensic examiners found that they could retrieve even deleted data using "flasher" or "twister" boxes, tools developed by OEMs to "flash" a phone's memory for debugging or updating. However, flasher boxes are invasive and can change data; can be complicated to use; and, because they are not developed as forensic tools, perform neither hash verifications nor (in most cases) audit trails. For physical forensic examinations, therefore, better alternatives remain necessary.

To meet these demands, commercial tools appeared which allowed examiners to recover phone memory with minimal disruption and analyze it separately. Over time these commercial techniques have developed further and the recovery of deleted data from proprietary mobile devices has become possible with some specialist tools. Moreover, commercial tools have even automated much of the extraction process, rendering it possible even for minimally trained first responders—who currently are much more likely to encounter suspects with mobile devices in their possession, compared to computers—to perform basic extractions for triage and data preview purposes.

== Professional applications ==
Mobile device forensics is best known for its application to law enforcement investigations, but it is also useful for military intelligence, corporate investigations, private investigations, criminal and civil defense, and electronic discovery.

== Types of evidence ==
As mobile device technology advances, the amount and types of data that can be found on a mobile device is constantly increasing. Evidence that can be potentially recovered from a mobile phone may come from several different sources, including handset memory, SIM card, and attached memory cards such as SD cards.

Traditionally mobile phone forensics has been associated with recovering SMS and MMS messaging, as well as call logs, contact lists and phone IMEI/ESN information. However, newer generations of smartphones also include wider varieties of information; from web browsing, wireless network settings, geolocation information (including geotags contained within image metadata), e-mail and other forms of rich internet media, including important data—such as social networking service posts and contacts—now retained on smartphone 'apps'.

=== Internal memory ===
Nowadays mostly flash memory consisting of NAND or NOR types are used for mobile devices.

=== External memory ===
External memory devices are SIM cards, SD cards (commonly found within GPS devices as well as mobile phones), MMC cards, CF cards, and the Memory Stick.

=== Service provider logs ===
Although not technically part of mobile device forensics, the call detail records (and occasionally, text messages) from wireless carriers often serve as "back up" evidence obtained after the mobile phone has been seized. These are useful when the call history and/or text messages have been deleted from the phone, or when location-based services are not turned on. Call detail records and cell site (tower) dumps can show the phone owner's location, and whether they were stationary or moving (i.e., whether the phone's signal bounced off the same side of a single tower, or different sides of multiple towers along a particular path of travel). Carrier data and device data together can be used to corroborate information from other sources, for instance, video surveillance footage or eyewitness accounts; or to determine the general location where a non-geotagged image or video was taken.

The European Union requires its member countries to retain certain telecommunications data for use in investigations. This includes data on calls made and retrieved. The location of a mobile phone can be determined and this geographical data must also be retained. In the United States, however, no such requirement exists, and no standards govern how long carriers should retain data or even what they must retain. For example, text messages may be retained only for a week or two, while call logs may be retained anywhere from a few weeks to several months. To reduce the risk of evidence being lost, law enforcement agents must submit a preservation letter to the carrier, which they then must back up with a search warrant.

== Forensic process ==
The forensics process for mobile devices broadly matches other branches of digital forensics; however, some particular concerns apply. Generally, the process can be broken down into three main categories: seizure, acquisition, and examination/analysis. Other aspects of the computer forensic process, such as intake, validation, documentation/reporting, and archiving still apply.

=== Seizure ===
Seizing mobile devices is covered by the same legal considerations as other digital media. Mobiles will often be recovered switched on; as the aim of seizure is to preserve evidence, the device will often be transported in the same state to avoid a shutdown, which would change files. In addition, the investigator or first responder would risk user lock activation.

However, leaving the phone on carries another risk: the device can still make a network/cellular connection. This may bring in new data, overwriting evidence. To prevent a connection, mobile devices will often be transported and examined from within a Faraday cage (or bag). Even so, there are two disadvantages to this method. First, most bags render the device unusable, as its touch screen or keypad cannot be used. However, special cages can be acquired that allow the use of the device with a see-through glass and special gloves. The advantage with this option is the ability to also connect to other forensic equipment while blocking the network connection, as well as charging the device. If this option is not available, network isolation is advisable either through placing the device in airplane mode, or cloning its SIM card (a technique which can also be useful when the device is missing its SIM card entirely).

It is to note that while this technique can prevent triggering a remote wipe (or tampering) of the device, it doesn't do anything against a local dead man's switch.

=== Acquisition ===
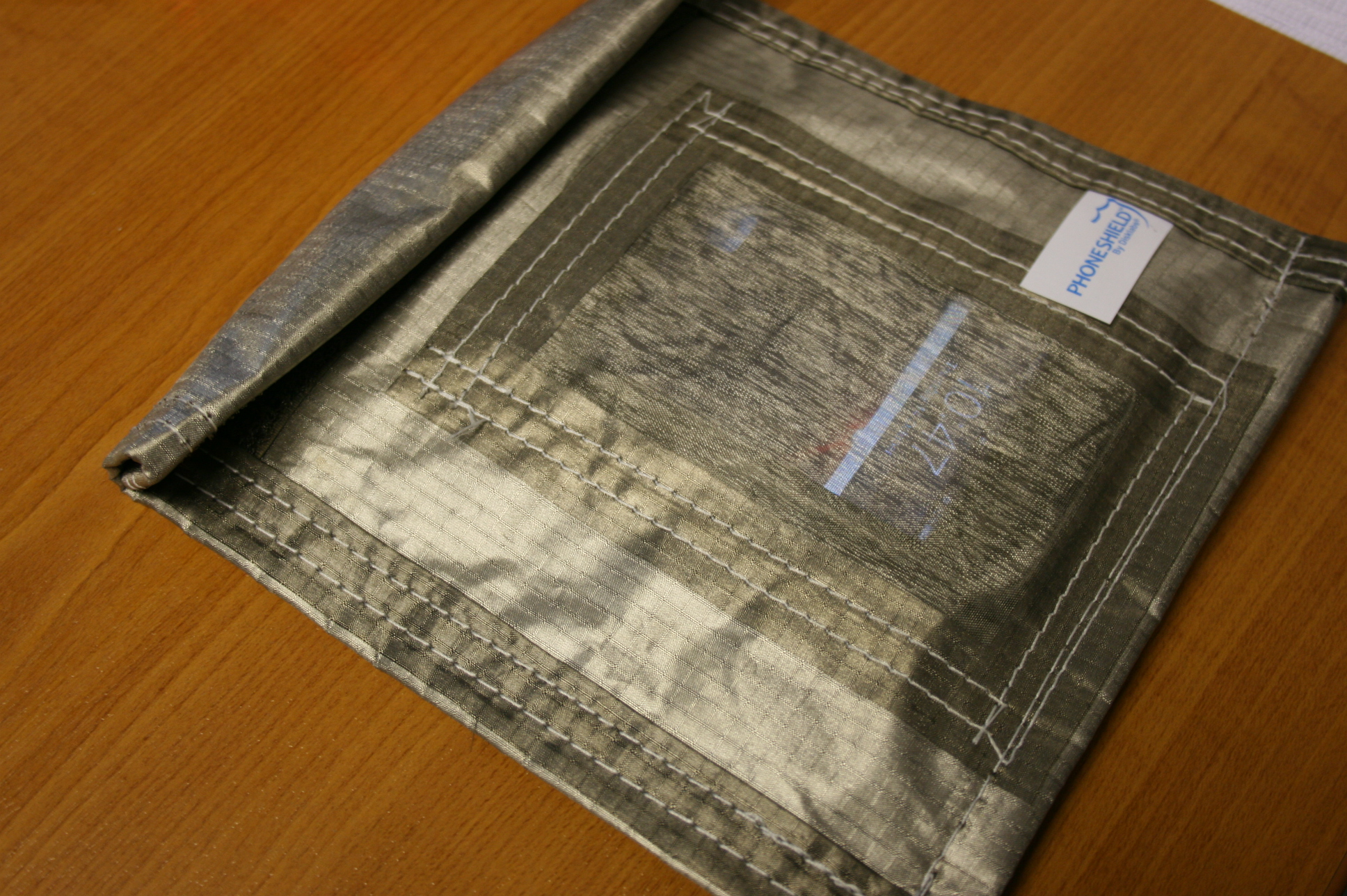
iPhone in an RF shield bag

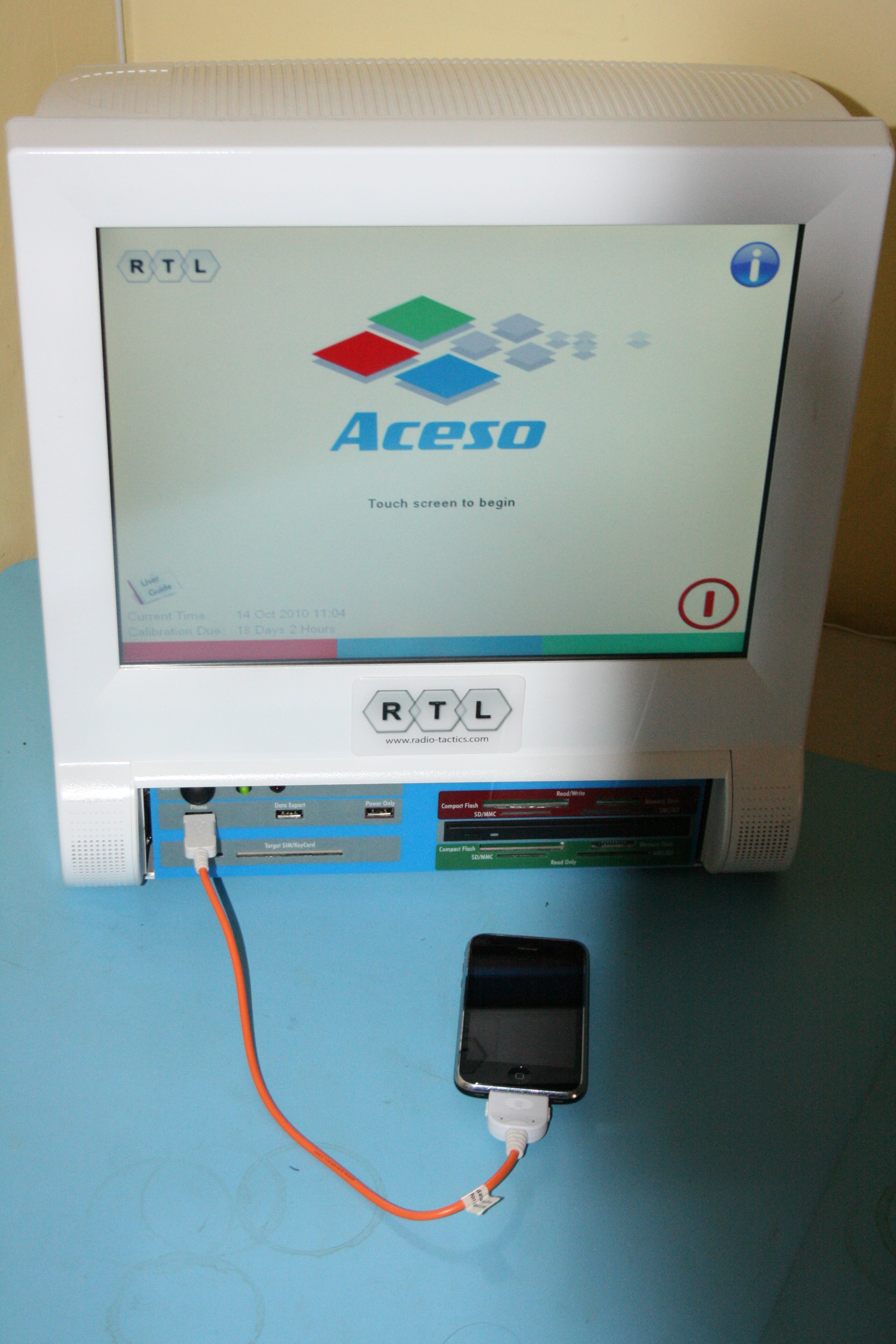
RTL Aceso, a mobile device acquisition unit

The second step in the forensic process is acquisition, in this case usually referring to retrieval of material from a device (as compared to the bit-copy imaging used in computer forensics).

Due to the proprietary nature of mobiles it is often not possible to acquire data with it powered down; most mobile device acquisition is performed live. With more advanced smartphones using advanced memory management, connecting it to a recharger and putting it into a faraday cage may not be good practice. The mobile device would recognize the network disconnection and therefore it would change its status information that can trigger the memory manager to write data.

Most acquisition tools for mobile devices are commercial in nature and consist of a hardware and software component, often automated.

=== Examination and analysis ===
As an increasing number of mobile devices use high-level file systems, similar to the file systems of computers, methods and tools can be taken over from hard disk forensics or only need slight changes.

The FAT file system is generally used on NAND memory. A difference is the block size used, which is larger than 512 bytes for hard disks and depends on the used memory type, e.g., NOR type 64, 128, 256 and NAND memory of 16, 128, 256, or 512 kibibytes.

Different software tools can extract the data from the memory image. One could use specialized and automated forensic software products or generic file viewers such as any hex editor to search for characteristics of file headers. The advantage of the hex editor is the deeper insight into the memory management, but working with a hex editor means a lot of handwork and file system as well as file header knowledge. In contrast, specialized forensic software simplifies the search and extracts the data but may not find everything. AccessData, Sleuthkit, ESI Analyst and EnCase, to mention only some, are forensic software products to analyze memory images. Since there is no tool that extracts all possible information, it is advisable to use two or more tools for examination. There is currently (February 2010) no software solution to get all evidences from flash memories.

== Data acquisition types ==
Mobile device data extraction can be classified according to a continuum, along which methods become more technical and “forensically sound,” tools become more expensive, analysis takes longer, examiners need more training, and some methods can even become more invasive.

=== Manual acquisition ===
The examiner utilizes the user interface to investigate the content of the phone's memory. Therefore, the device is used as normal, with the examiner taking pictures of each screen's contents. This method has an advantage in that the operating system makes it unnecessary to use specialized tools or equipment to transform raw data into human interpretable information. In practice this method is applied to cell phones, PDAs and navigation systems. Disadvantages are that only data visible to the operating system can be recovered; that all data is only available in the form of pictures; and the process itself is time-consuming.

=== Logical acquisition ===
Logical acquisition implies a bit-by-bit copy of logical storage objects (e.g., directories and files) that reside on a logical storage (e.g., a file system partition). Logical acquisition has the advantage that system data structures are easier for a tool to extract and organize. Logical extraction acquires information from the device using the original equipment manufacturer's application programming interface for synchronizing the phone's contents with a personal computer. A logical extraction is generally easier to work with as it does not produce a large binary blob. However, a skilled forensic examiner will be able to extract far more information from a physical extraction.

==== File system acquisition ====
Logical extraction usually does not produce any deleted information, due to it normally being removed from the phone's file system. However, in some cases—particularly with platforms built on SQLite, such as iOS and Android—the phone may keep a database file of information which does not overwrite the information but simply marks it as deleted and available for later overwriting. In such cases, if the device allows file system access through its synchronization interface, it is possible to recover deleted information. File system extraction is useful for understanding the file structure, web browsing history, or app usage, as well as providing the examiner with the ability to perform an analysis with traditional computer forensic tools.

=== Physical acquisition ===
Physical acquisition implies a bit-for-bit copy of an entire physical store (e.g. flash memory); therefore, it is the method most similar to the examination of a personal computer. A physical acquisition has the advantage of allowing deleted files and data remnants to be examined. Physical extraction acquires information from the device by direct access to the flash memories.

Generally this is harder to achieve because the device original equipment manufacturer needs to secure against arbitrary reading of memory; therefore, a device may be locked to a certain operator. To get around this security, mobile forensics tool vendors often develop their own boot loaders, enabling the forensic tool to access the memory (and often, also to bypass user passcodes or pattern locks).

Generally the physical extraction is split into two steps, the dumping phase and the decoding phase.

=== Brute force acquisition ===
Brute force acquisition can be performed by third party passcode brute force tools that send a series of passcodes/passwords to the mobile device. Brute-force attack is a time-consuming method, but effective nonetheless. This technique uses trial and error in an attempt to create the correct combination of password or PIN to authenticate access to the mobile device. Despite the process taking an extensive amount of time, it is still one of the best methods to employ if the forensic professional is unable to obtain the passcode. With current available software and hardware it has become quite easy to break the encryption on a mobile device's password file to obtain the passcode. Two manufacturers have become public since the release of the iPhone5, Cellebrite and GrayShift. These manufacturers are intended for law enforcement agencies and police departments. The Cellebrite UFED Ultimate unit costs over USD 40,000 and GrayShift's system costs USD 15,000. Brute forcing tools are connected to the device and will physically send codes on iOS devices starting from 0000 to 9999 in sequence until the correct code is successfully entered. Once the code entry has been successful, full access to the device is given and data extraction can commence.

== Tools ==
Early investigations consisted of live manual analysis of mobile devices; with examiners photographing or writing down useful material for use as evidence. Without forensic photography equipment such as Fernico ZRT, EDEC Eclipse, or Project-a-Phone, this had the disadvantage of risking the modification of the device content, as well as leaving many parts of the proprietary operating system inaccessible.

In recent years a number of hardware/software tools have emerged to recover logical and physical evidence from mobile devices. Most tools consist of both hardware and software portions. The hardware includes a number of cables to connect the mobile device to the acquisition machine; the software exists to extract the evidence and, occasionally, even to analyze it.

Most recently, mobile device forensic tools have been developed for the field. This is in response both to military units' demand for fast and accurate anti-terrorism intelligence, and to law enforcement demand for forensic previewing capabilities at a crime scene, search warrant execution, or exigent circumstances. Such mobile forensic tools are often ruggedized for harsh environments (e.g. the battlefield) and rough treatment (e.g. being dropped or submerged in water).

Generally, because it is impossible for any one tool to capture all evidence from all mobile devices, mobile forensic professionals recommend that examiners establish entire toolkits consisting of a mix of commercial, open-source, broad support, and narrow support forensic tools, together with accessories such as battery chargers, Faraday bags or other signal disruption equipment, and so forth.

=== Commercial forensic tools ===
Commercial tools with mobile acquisition test results listed by NIST include Belkasoft Evidence Center X, Cellebrite UFED, Elcomsoft iOS Forensic Toolkit, Magnet Axiom, MOBILedit Forensic Express, Oxygen Forensic Detective, Secure View and Micro Systemation XRY.

Some tools have additionally been developed to address increasing criminal usage of phones manufactured with Chinese chipsets, which include MediaTek (MTK), Spreadtrum and MStar. Such tools include Cellebrite's CHINEX, and XRY PinPoint.

=== Open-source ===
Most open-source mobile forensics tools are platform-specific and geared toward smartphone analysis. Though not originally designed to be a forensics tool, BitPim has been widely used on CDMA phones as well as LG VX4400/VX6000 and many Sanyo Sprint cell phones.

=== Physical tools ===
==== Forensic desoldering ====
Commonly referred to as a "chip-off" technique within the industry, the last and most intrusive method to get a memory image is to desolder the non-volatile memory chip and connect it to a memory chip reader. This method contains the potential danger of total data destruction: it is possible to destroy the chip and its content because of the heat required during desoldering. Before the invention of the BGA technology it was possible to attach probes to the pins of the memory chip and to recover the memory through these probes. The BGA technique bonds the chips directly onto the PCB through molten solder balls, such that it is no longer possible to attach probes.

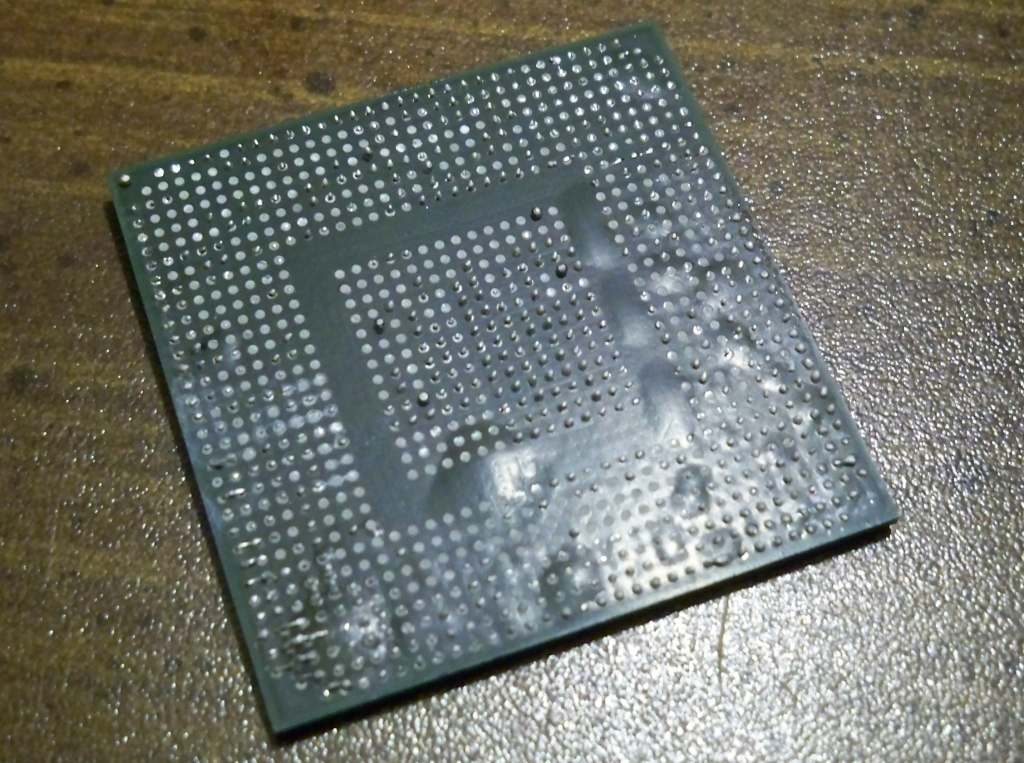
Moisture in this circuit board turned to steam when it was subjected to intense heat. This produces the so-called "popcorn effect."

Desoldering the chips is done carefully and slowly, so that the heat does not destroy the chip or data. Before the chip is desoldered the PCB is baked in an oven to eliminate remaining water. This prevents the so-called popcorn effect, at which the remaining water would blow the chip package at desoldering.

There are mainly three methods to melt the solder: hot air, infrared light, and steam-phasing. The infrared light technology works with a focused infrared light beam onto a specific integrated circuit and is used for small chips. The hot air and steam methods cannot focus as much as the infrared technique.

===== Chip re-balling =====
After desoldering the chip a re-balling process cleans the chip and adds new tin balls to the chip. Re-balling can be done in two different ways.

- The first is to use a stencil. The stencil is chip-dependent and must fit exactly. Then the tin-solder is put on the stencil. After cooling the tin the stencil is removed and if necessary a second cleaning step is done.
- The second method is laser re-balling. Here the stencil is programmed into the re-balling unit. A bondhead (looks like a tube/needle) is automatically loaded with one tin ball from a solder ball singulation tank. The ball is then heated by a laser, such that the tin-solder ball becomes fluid and flows onto the cleaned chip. Instantly after melting the ball the laser turns off and a new ball falls into the bondhead. While reloading, the bondhead of the re-balling unit changes the position to the next pin.

A third method makes the entire re-balling process unnecessary. The chip is connected to an adapter with Y-shaped springs or spring-loaded pogo pins. The Y-shaped springs need to have a ball onto the pin to establish an electric connection, but the pogo pins can be used directly on the pads on the chip without the balls.

The advantage of forensic desoldering is that the device does not need to be functional and that a copy without any changes to the original data can be made. The disadvantage is that the re-balling devices are expensive, so this process is very costly and there are some risks of total data loss. Hence, forensic desoldering should only be done by experienced laboratories.

==== JTAG ====
Existing standardized interfaces for reading data are built into several mobile devices, e.g., to get position data from GPS equipment (NMEA) or to get deceleration information from airbag units.

Not all mobile devices provide such a standardized interface nor does there exist a standard interface for all mobile devices, but all manufacturers have one problem in common. The miniaturizing of device parts opens the question how to automatically test the functionality and quality of the soldered integrated components. For this problem an industry group, the Joint Test Action Group (JTAG), developed a test technology called boundary scan.

Despite the standardization there are four tasks before the JTAG device interface can be used to recover the memory. To find the correct bits in the boundary scan register one must know which processor and memory circuits are used and how they are connected to the system bus. When not accessible from outside one must find the test points for the JTAG interface on the printed circuit board and determine which test point is used for which signal. The JTAG port is not always soldered with connectors, such that it is sometimes necessary to open the device and re-solder the access port. The protocol for reading the memory must be known and finally the correct voltage must be determined to prevent damage to the circuit.

The boundary scan produces a complete forensic image of the volatile and non-volatile memory. The risk of data change is minimized and the memory chip doesn't have to be desoldered. Generating the image can be slow and not all mobile devices are JTAG enabled. Also, it can be difficult to find the test access port.

=== Command line tools ===
==== System commands ====
Mobile devices do not provide the possibility to run or boot from a CD, connecting to a network share or another device with clean tools. Therefore, system commands could be the only way to save the volatile memory of a mobile device. With the risk of modified system commands it must be estimated if the volatile memory is really important. A similar problem arises when no network connection is available and no secondary memory can be connected to a mobile device because the volatile memory image must be saved on the internal non-volatile memory, where the user data is stored and most likely deleted important data will be lost. System commands are the cheapest method, but imply some risks of data loss. Every command usage with options and output must be documented.

==== AT commands ====
AT commands are old modem commands, e.g., Hayes command set and Motorola phone AT commands, and can therefore only be used on a device that has modem support. Using these commands one can only obtain information through the operating system, such that no deleted data can be extracted.

==== dd ====
For external memory and the USB flash drive, appropriate software, e.g., the Unix command dd, is needed to make the bit-level copy. Furthermore, USB flash drives with memory protection do not need special hardware and can be connected to any computer. Many USB drives and memory cards have a write-lock switch that can be used to prevent data changes, while making a copy.

If the USB drive has no protection switch, a blocker can be used to mount the drive in a read-only mode or, in an exceptional case, the memory chip can be desoldered. The SIM and memory cards need a card reader to make the copy. The SIM card is soundly analyzed, such that it is possible to recover (deleted) data like contacts or text messages.

The Android operating system includes the dd command. In a blog post on Android forensic techniques, a method to live image an Android device using the dd command is demonstrated.

=== Non-forensic commercial tools ===
==== Flasher tools ====
A flasher tool is programming hardware and/or software that can be used to program (flash) the device memory, e.g., EEPROM or flash memory. These tools mainly originate from the manufacturer or service centers for debugging, repair, or upgrade services. They can overwrite the non-volatile memory and some, depending on the manufacturer or device, can also read the memory to make a copy, originally intended as a backup. The memory can be protected from reading, e.g., by software command or destruction of fuses in the read circuit.

Note, this would not prevent writing or using the memory internally by the CPU. The flasher tools are easy to connect and use, but some can change the data and have other dangerous options or do not make a complete copy.

== Controversies ==
In general there exists no standard for what constitutes a supported device in a specific product. This has led to the situation where different vendors define a supported device differently. A situation such as this makes it much harder to compare products based on vendor-provided lists of supported devices. For instance a device where logical extraction using one product only produces a list of calls made by the device may be listed as supported by that vendor while another vendor can produce much more information.

Furthermore, different products extract different amounts of information from different devices. This leads to a very complex landscape when trying to overview the products. In general this leads to a situation where testing a product extensively before purchase is strongly recommended. It is quite common to use at least two products which complement each other.

== Anti-forensics ==
Anti-computer forensics is more difficult because of the small size of the devices and the user's restricted data accessibility. Nevertheless, there are developments to secure the memory in hardware with security circuits in the CPU and memory chip, such that the memory chip cannot be read even after desoldering.

== See also ==
- List of digital forensics tools
