= United States v. Hubbell =

- Supreme Court of the United States

Argued February 22, 2000 Decided June 5, 2000
- Full case name: United States of America v. Webster Hubbell
- Citations: 530 U.S. 27 (more) 120 S. Ct. 2037; 147 L. Ed. 2d 24; 2000 U.S. LEXIS 3768

Case history
- Prior: 11 F. Supp. 2d 25 (D.D.C. 1998); vacated and remanded, 167 F.3d 552 (D.C. Cir. 1999); 44 F. Supp. 2d 1 (D.D.C. 1999); reversed, 177 F.3d 11 (D.C. Cir. 1999); cert. granted, 528 U.S. 926 (2000).

Holding
- (1) The Fifth Amendment privilege against compelled self-incrimination protects a witness from being compelled to disclose the existence of incriminating documents that the Government is unable to describe with reasonable particularity; and (2) Where the witness produces such documents pursuant to a grant of immunity, 18 U. S. C. §6002 prevents the Government from using them to prepare criminal charges against the witness.

Court membership
- Chief Justice William Rehnquist Associate Justices John P. Stevens · Sandra Day O'Connor; Antonin Scalia · Anthony Kennedy; David Souter · Clarence Thomas; Ruth Bader Ginsburg · Stephen Breyer

Case opinions
- Majority: Stevens, joined by O'Connor, Scalia, Kennedy, Souter, Thomas, Ginsburg, Breyer
- Concurrence: Thomas, joined by Scalia
- Dissent: Rehnquist

Laws applied
- U.S. Const. amend. V; 18 USC section 6003 (a)

United States v. Hubbell, 530 U.S. 27 (2000), was a United States Supreme Court case involving Webster Hubbell, who had been indicted on various tax-related charges, and mail and wire fraud charges, based on documents that the government had subpoenaed from him. The Fifth Amendment provides that no person "shall be compelled in any criminal case to be a witness against himself." The Supreme Court has, since 1976, applied the so-called "act-of-production doctrine". Under this doctrine, a person can invoke his Fifth Amendment rights against the production of documents only where the very act of producing the documents is incriminating in itself.

== Background ==
This case involved the second prosecution of Webster Hubbell by the Independent Counsel. The prosecution arose from the Independent Counsel's attempt to determine whether Hubbell had violated a promise (part of a plea agreement) to cooperate in the Whitewater investigation. In October 1996, while Hubbell was in jail as a result of the conviction on the guilty plea in the Whitewater case, the Independent Counsel served him with a subpoena duces tecum calling for the production of eleven categories of documents before a grand jury.

In November 1996, Hubbell appeared before the grand jury and invoked his Fifth Amendment privilege against self-incrimination. In response to questioning by the prosecutor, Hubbell initially refused "to state whether there are documents within my possession, custody, or control responsive to the Subpoena." The prosecutor then produced an order, which had been obtained from the District Court pursuant to 18 U.S.C. § 6003(a), directing Hubbell to respond to the subpoena and granting him immunity "to the extent allowed by law".

Hubbell then produced 13,120 pages of documents and records. He also responded to a series of questions that established that the produced documents were all of the documents in his custody or control that were responsive to the commands in the subpoena (with the exception of a few documents he claimed were shielded by the attorney-client and attorney work-product privileges).

The contents of the documents produced by Hubbell provided the Independent Counsel with the information that led to the second prosecution.

== Procedural history ==
The U.S. District Court dismissed the indictment against Hubbell, and the Court of Appeals reversed that decision. The United States Supreme Court agreed to hear the case. Oral arguments were heard February 22, 2000, and the Court announced its decision on June 5.

== Opinion of the Court ==
The Supreme Court ruled in favor of Hubbell. The Court held that the Fifth Amendment privilege against self-incrimination protects a witness from being compelled to disclose the existence of incriminating documents that the Government is unable to describe with reasonable particularity. The Court also ruled that if the witness produces such documents, pursuant to a grant of immunity, the government may not use them to prepare criminal charges against him.

=== Thomas concurrence ===
Justice Clarence Thomas wrote a separate concurrence examining a wide range of historical materials on the original meaning of the Fifth Amendment. He concluded that the Constitution should protect against the "compelled production not just of incriminating testimony, but of any incriminating evidence."

=== Rehnquist Dissenting Statement ===
Chief Justice William Rehnquist issued a short dissenting statement, dissenting in part for the reasons which had been given in the dissent in the Court of Appeals below.

== Quotations from the Supreme Court's opinion ==
Before the U.S. Supreme Court, the prosecutor argued that because the government's possession of the documents was the fruit only of the simple physical act of Hubbell's production of those documents, Hubbell's immunity should not prevent the prosecutor from making derivative use of the documents, even though Hubbell's production of those documents was the result of Hubbell's compliance with the court order granting him immunity.

The United States Supreme Court rejected the prosecutor's argument. The Court stated:

It was unquestionably necessary for respondent [Webster Hubbell] to make extensive use of "the contents of his own mind" in identifying the hundreds of documents responsive to the requests in the subpoena. .... The Government's anemic view of respondent's act of production as a mere physical act that is principally non-testimonial in character and can be entirely divorced from its "implicit" testimonial aspect so as to constitute a "legitimate, wholly independent source" ... for the documents produced simply fails to account for these realities.

The Supreme Court also stated:

The question is not whether the response to the subpoena may be introduced into evidence at his criminal trial. That would surely be a prohibited "use" of the immunized act of production.... But the fact that the Government intends no such use of the act of production leaves open the separate question whether it has already made "derivative use" of the testimonial aspect of that act in obtaining the indictment against respondent and in preparing its case for trial. It clearly has.

It is apparent from the text of the subpoena itself that the prosecutor needed respondent's assistance both to identify potential sources of information and to produce those sources.... Given the breadth of the description of the 11 categories of documents called for by the subpoena, the collection and production [by Webster Hubbell] of the materials demanded was tantamount to answering a series of interrogatories asking a witness [in this case, Webster Hubbell] to disclose the existence and location of particular documents fitting certain broad descriptions. The assembly of literally hundreds of pages of material in response to a request for "any and all documents reflecting, referring, or relating to any direct or indirect sources of money or other things of value received by or provided to" an individual or members of his family during a 3-year period ... is the functional equivalent of the preparation of an answer to either a detailed written interrogatory or a series of oral questions at a discovery deposition. Entirely apart from the contents of the 13,120 pages of materials that respondent produced in this case, it is undeniable that providing a catalog of existing documents fitting within any of the 11 broadly worded subpoena categories could provide a prosecutor with a "lead to incriminating evidence," or "a link in the chain of evidence needed to prosecute." ...

It is abundantly clear that the testimonial aspect of respondent's act of producing subpoenaed documents was the first step in a chain of evidence that led to this prosecution. The documents did not magically appear in the prosecutor's office like "manna from heaven." They arrived there only after respondent [Hubbell] asserted his constitutional privilege, received a grant of immunity, and—under the compulsion of the District Court's order—took the mental and physical steps necessary to provide the prosecutor with an accurate inventory of the many sources of potentially incriminating evidence sought by the subpoena. It was only through respondent's truthful reply to the subpoena that the Government received the incriminating documents of which it made "substantial use ... in the investigation that led to the indictment." ....

The Court stated:

[...] the constitutional privilege against self-incrimination protects the target of a grand jury investigation from being compelled to answer questions designed to elicit information about the existence of sources of potentially incriminating evidence. That constitutional privilege has the same application to the testimonial aspect of a response to a subpoena seeking discovery of those sources....

The Court also stated:

The Government cannot cure this deficiency through the overbroad argument that a businessman such as respondent will always possess general business and tax records that fall within the broad categories described in this subpoena. ... [R]espondent's act of production had a testimonial aspect, at least with respect to the existence and location of the documents sought by the Government's subpoena....

The Supreme Court upheld the lower courts' decisions throwing out the charges against Hubbell.

== Summary of the Act of Production Doctrine ==
Under the Act of Production Doctrine, the act of an individual in producing documents or materials (e.g., in response to a subpoena) may have a "testimonial aspect" for purposes of the individual's right to assert the Fifth Amendment privilege against self-incrimination to the extent that the individual's act of production provides information not already in the hands of law enforcement personnel about the (1) existence; (2) custody; or (3) authenticity, of the documents or materials produced.

== See also ==
- List of United States Supreme Court cases, volume 530
- List of United States Supreme Court cases
- Lists of United States Supreme Court cases by volume
- In re Boucher
- United States v. Fricosu
