= FTC v. Dean Foods Co. =

Federal Trade Commission v. Dean Foods Co.
- Supreme Court of the United States

Argued March 28, 1966 Decided June 13, 1966
- Full case name: Federal Trade Commission v. Dean Foods Company, et al.
- Citations: 384 U.S. 597 (more) 86 S. Ct. 1738; 16 L. Ed. 2d 802; 1966 U.S. LEXIS 2985; 1966 Trade Cas. (CCH) ¶ 71,788

Case history
- Prior: 356 F.2d 481 (7th Cir. 1966)

Holding
- The Federal Trade Commission (FTC) may sue in federal court to obtain a preliminary injunction to maintain the status quo against the consummation of a merger that the agency persuasively contends violates the antitrust laws.

Court membership
- Chief Justice Earl Warren Associate Justices Hugo Black · William O. Douglas; Tom C. Clark · John M. Harlan II; William J. Brennan Jr. · Potter Stewart; Byron White · Abe Fortas

Case opinions
- Majority: Clark, joined by Warren, Black, Douglas, Brennan
- Dissent: Fortas, joined by Harlan, Stewart, White

FTC v. Dean Foods Co., 384 U.S. 597 (1966), is a 1966 decision of the United States Supreme Court holding that the Federal Trade Commission (FTC) may sue in federal court to obtain a preliminary injunction to maintain the status quo against the consummation of a merger that the agency persuasively contends violates the antitrust laws.

More broadly, the Dean Foods case stands for the proposition that a federal agency may, by invoking the All Writs Act, seek equitable relief in federal court against a person's threatened action that will substantially interfere with the agency's performance of its statutory duty and thus adversely affect the relevant court's ability to review the agency's ultimate order with respect to the threatened action.

== Facts ==
Dean Foods and Bowman Dairy, two substantial competitors in the sale of milk in the Chicago area, agreed to a merger. Dean was the second largest firm and Bowman the third or fourth, and together they accounted for 23% of milk sales in the area. The FTC filed an administrative complaint to prevent the merger and sought to maintain the status quo pending completion of administrative hearings by filing a petition with the United States Court of Appeals for the Seventh Circuit for a temporary restraining order and preliminary injunction under the All Writs Act.

== Ruling of Seventh Circuit ==
The FTC argued that preliminary injunctive relief was needed pending completion of the administrative process in the FTC. According to the agency, otherwise, Dean would eliminate Bowman as a competitive entity by selling off its milk routes, its plants, and its equipment. This would prevent restoration of Dean as an effective competitor if the agency later found the merger unlawful. The FTC maintained that such preemptive action by Dean would effectively deprive the court of appeals of its appellate jurisdiction to review the FTC's final order, because any order would be meaningless as a practical matter. On that basis, the FTC maintained, the All Writs Act supplied the court of appeals for the area in which the companies operated with jurisdiction to issue preliminary injunctive relief so that a meaningful appeal could later occur.

The Seventh Circuit dismissed the petition on the ground that the FTC lacked authority to seek such relief (that is, it had no standing to sue), since Congress had not passed any statute giving the FTC specific authority to seek a preliminary injunction. At that point Dean immediately began closing Bowman down and eliminating it as a business.

== Ruling of Supreme Court ==
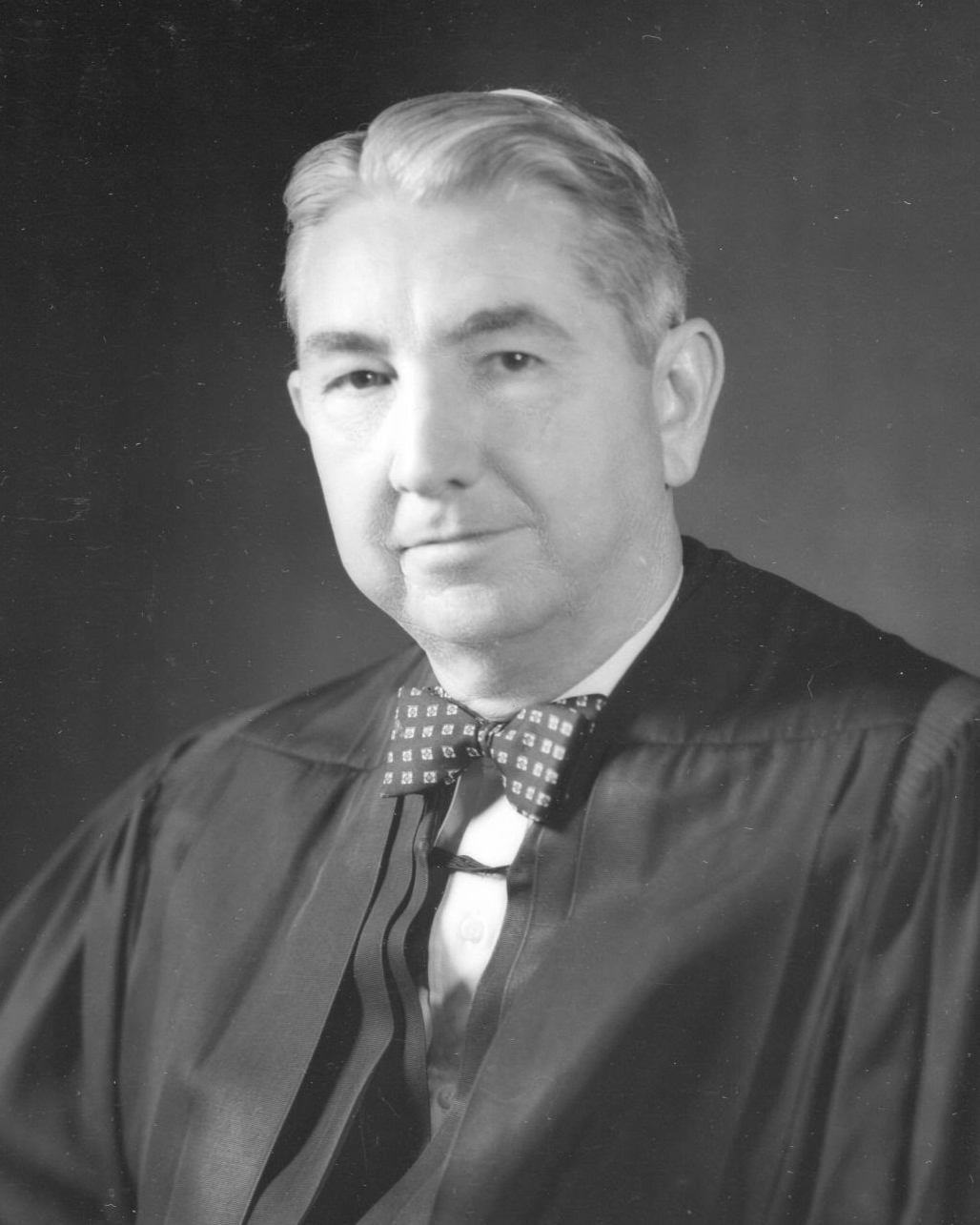
Justice Clark

The Supreme Court (5-4), in an opinion by Justice Tom C. Clark, recognized that the FTC had several times, without success, asked Congress to pass a law authorizing it to obtain preliminary injunctions in merger cases. The Court said that this did not matter: "Congress neither enacted nor rejected these proposals; it simply did not act on them." In any case, the Court added, nothing has limited the courts' historic powers under the All Writs Act. "We thus hold that the Commission has standing to seek preliminary relief from the Court of Appeals under the circumstances alleged."

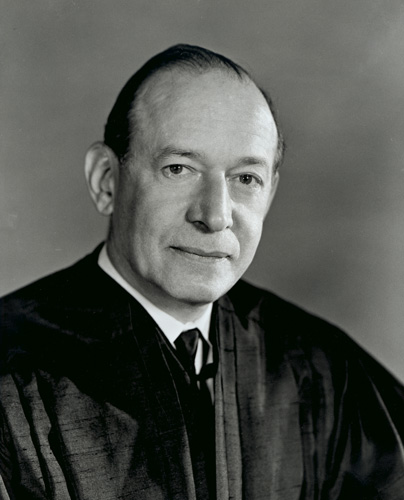
Justice Fortas

Justice Abe Fortas wrote a strong dissent, saying that such awesome power to interfere with mergers should not be entrusted to the FTC without a specific authorization from Congress. Fortas had been legal advisor to Federated Department Stores, Inc. at the time of its four-month fight with the chairman and co-founder of Bullock's, Inc., which had involved an intra-family proxy fight in which such an injunction had been threatened. Federated eventually acquired Bullock's, but it was forced to compromise with the FTC in a consent decree in which Federated agreed to make no more acquisitions until 1970.

== Significance and aftermath ==
The reasoning of the Court is not limited to the FTC and by its terms would apply with equal force to any other federal agency in similar circumstances.

However, the principle may be limited to situations of great urgency. In FTC v. PepsiCo, Inc., the FTC sought a preliminary injunction against a merger and the Second Circuit denied it. The court said that, under Dean Foods, an injunction can issue only if the commission can show that "an effective remedial order, once the merger was implemented, would otherwise be virtually impossible, thus rendering the enforcement of any final decree of divestiture futile." The Second Circuit thought that the merger probably violated the antitrust laws but did not believe that effective relief would be “virtually impossible.”

In Sampson v. Murray, the Supreme Court held Dean Foods inapplicable to a stay of a General Services Administration (GSA) dismissal, stating: "In direct contrast to the claim of the FTC in Dean Foods that its jurisdiction would be effectively defeated by denial of relief, the Commission here has argued that judicial action interferes with the normal agency processes. And we see nothing in the record to suggest that any judicial review available under the doctrine of Service v. Dulles would be defeated in the same manner as review in Dean Foods."

In the wake of similar decisions, in 1973, Congress passed specific legislation granting the FTC authority to bring suits in district courts to obtain preliminary injunctions to prevent consummation of mergers pending action before the FTC, under a legal standard requiring likelihoods of success on the merits rather than a defeat of the agency proceeding. In addition, Congress passed the Hart-Scott-Rodino Act, which also created administrative clearance procedures having the effect of delaying consummation of mergers while agency evaluation of the competitive impact took place.

In 1984, the D.C. Circuit relied on Dean Foods as authority for issuance of an order to compel the FCC to act on a petition that it had allegedly delayed unreasonably in acting upon.

== See also ==
- US antitrust law

== Notes ==
The citations in this article are written in Bluebook style. Please see the talk page for more information.
