= United States v. Fricosu =

Federal criminal case

- Court: United States District Court for the District of Colorado
- Full case name: United States of America v. Ramona Camelia Fricosu, a.k.a. Ramona Smith
- Citations: United States v. Fricosu, 841 F.Supp.2d (United States District Court for the District of Colorado 2012).

Court membership
- Judge sitting: Robert E. Blackburn

Keywords
- encryption, self-incrimination

United States v. Fricosu, 841 F.Supp.2d 1232 (D. Col 2012), is a federal criminal case in Colorado that addressed whether a person can be compelled to reveal his or her encryption passphrase or password, despite the U.S. Constitution's Fifth Amendment protection against self-incrimination. On January 23, 2012, judge Robert E. Blackburn held that under the All Writs Act, Fricosu is required to produce an unencrypted hard drive.

Fricosu's attorney claimed it was possible she did not remember the password. A month later, Fricosu's ex-husband handed the police a list of potential passwords. One of the passwords worked, rendering the self-incrimination issue moot.

The Electronic Frontier Foundation filed an amicus brief in support of Fricosu.

Fricosu subsequently entered a plea agreement in 2013, meaning that the question of a defendant's right to resist mandatory decryption will not be addressed by a higher court until such time as a future case addressing the same issue arises.

== See also ==
- Key disclosure law
- In re Boucher
- United States v. Kirschner
