= United States v. New York Telephone Co. =

- Supreme Court of the United States

Argued October 3, 1977 Decided December 7, 1977
- Full case name: United States v. New York Telephone Co.
- Citations: 434 U.S. 159 (more) 98 S. Ct. 364; 54 L. Ed. 2d 376
- Argument: Oral argument

Case history
- Prior: In re Order Authorizing the Use of a Pen Register, 416 F. Supp. 800 (S.D.N.Y. 1976); affirmed in part, reversed in part, 538 F.2d 956 (2d Cir. 1976); cert. granted, 429 U.S. 1072 (1977).

Holding
- The power conferred by the All Writs Act extends to third parties who are in a position to frustrate the implementation of a court order or the proper administration of justice.

Court membership
- Chief Justice Warren E. Burger Associate Justices William J. Brennan Jr. · Potter Stewart; Byron White · Thurgood Marshall; Harry Blackmun · Lewis F. Powell Jr. William Rehnquist · John P. Stevens

Case opinions
- Majority: White, joined by Burger, Blackmun, Powell, Rehnquist
- Concur/dissent: Stewart
- Dissent: Stevens, joined by Brennan, Marshall; Stewart (Part II)

Laws applied
- All Writs Act

United States v. New York Telephone Co., 434 U.S. 159 (1977), was a United States Supreme Court case in which the Court held that law enforcement officials may obtain a court order forcing telephone companies to install pen registers in order to record the numbers called from a particular telephone.

== Background ==
The Federal Bureau of Investigation suspected that a particular location in the Gramercy Park neighborhood of Manhattan homed a gambling operation, and asked the United States District Court for the Southern District of New York to order the New York Telephone Company to install a pen register. On March 19, 1976 District Court Judge Charles Henry Tenney did, finding probable cause of illegal gambling, authorized the installation of the pen register for up to twenty days, and ordered the telephone company to provide the necessary technical assistance required to install the pen register. The telephone company moved to vacate that order, arguing that a more specific wiretap order was required under Title III of the Omnibus Crime Control and Safe Streets Act of 1968. On April 2 Judge Tenney denied the motion, and the company assisted in the installation of the pen register, but appealed to the United States Court of Appeals for the Second Circuit.

On July 13 the Second Circuit agreed in part, holding that pen registers didn't fall under the provisions of Title III, and that the district court had the power to authorize their use under the Federal Rules of Criminal Procedure. However, Judges Harold Medina and Wilfred Feinberg also concluded that the district court had overstepped in ordering the company to provide technical assistance for their installation, provoking a dissent by Judge Walter R. Mansfield. The case was appealed to the Supreme Court of the United States. On October 3, 1977 the case was argued before the Supreme Court, with Deputy Solicitor General Lawrence G. Wallace appearing for the Government and George E. Ashley appearing for the respondent.

== Opinion of the Court ==
On December 7, 1977, the Court reversed the lower court. Writing for the Court, Justice Byron White first agreed that pen registers were not subject to the Title III restrictions on wiretap orders and that the Federal Rules of Criminal Procedure allowed courts to use pen registers. However, the All Writs Act gave the district court the power to order assistance from the telephone company. Under the Act, issuing an extraordinary writ will be necessary or appropriate whenever it prevents the frustration of the court's previous orders. Therefore, this power extends even to third parties if they are in a position to frustrate the court's orders.

Ordering assistance from the telephone company was appropriate under the All Writs Act because the company was closely related to the underlying controversy, it was not in any way burdened by providing assistance, and its assistance was necessary to the surveillance. Because the gambling operation was using the telephone to place illegal bets on a continuing basis, Justice White found the company was closely related to the controversy. Justice White found the company was not in any way burdened by providing “meager assistance” to the FBI because the company was a highly regulated public utility that regularly used pen registers, even just for billing. Finally, Justice White found the court's order had been necessary because there was "no conceivable way" the FBI could have successfully accomplished its investigation without assistance from the telephone company and, regardless, the company had received financial compensation.

== Dissents ==
Justice Potter Stewart wrote a concurrence in part and dissent in part to clarify that he agreed with all of the majority's opinion except for its discussion of the All Writs Act, and that he agreed with that part of Justice Stevens dissent on the All Writs Act.

Justice John Paul Stevens, joined by Justices William J. Brennan, Jr. and Thurgood Marshall dissented from all of the majority's opinion except for the holding that pen registers are not wiretaps. Justice Stevens believed the only precedence for the court forcing assistance from the telephone company was the reviled writ of assistance. Justice Stevens could not believe the First Congress would have granted federal courts a "roving commission" with “the wide ranging powers of an ombudsman” because writs of assistance were “one British practice that the Revolution was specifically intended to terminate”.

Justice Stevens saw the “open-ended grant of authority” in the majority's reading of the All Writs Act as fundamentally inconsistent with federal court's limited jurisdiction. As such, the dissenters believed the All Writs Act would only authorize a court order if its purpose is to aid the court's exercise of jurisdiction and the means selected are analogous to a common-law writ.

Justice Stevens remained resolute in his critique; a quarter century later in Syngenta Crop Protection, Inc. v. Henson, 537 U.S. 28 (2002) he was still calling to “expressly overrule that misguided decision”.

== Subsequent developments ==
The Electronic Communications Privacy Act (ECPA) was passed in 1986 (Pub. L. No. 99-508, 100 Stat. 1848). Title III created the Pen Register Act, which included restrictions on private and law enforcement uses of pen registers.

The case has been relied on by the government in the 2016 FBI–Apple encryption dispute, that an All Writs Act order could be granted if it followed three tests: the company's closeness to the case; whether the government's request places an undue burden; and whether the company's assistance was necessary.
