= Cellebrite =

Israeli digital forensics company

Cellebrite DI Ltd.
- Type: Public
- Traded as: Nasdaq: CLBT
- Industry: Telecommunication (cellular phones); Digital intelligence
- Founded: 1999; 27 years ago, in Petah Tikva, Israel
- Founders: Avi Yablonka; Yaron Baratz; Yuval Aflalo
- Headquarters: Petah Tikva
- Number of locations: 14 (2021)
- Area served: Worldwide
- Key people: Yossi Carmil (CEO); Dana Gerner (CFO); Marque Teegardin (president, Cellebrite Americas); Leeor Ben-Peretz (CSO); Osnat Tirosh (Chief People and Corporate Development Officer); Arthur Veinstein (President, Cellebrite International); Ronnen Armon (Chief Products and Technologies Officer); Lisa Cole (CMO)
- Number of employees: 1,000+ (2023)
- Parent: Sun Corporation (44%)
- Divisions: Mobilogy
- Website: cellebrite.com

Cellebrite DI Ltd. is an Israeli digital forensics company headquartered in Petah Tikva that provides tools for law enforcement agencies as well as enterprise companies and service providers to collect, review, analyze and manage digital data. Their flagship product series is the Cellebrite UFED.

Cellebrite's largest shareholder is Sun Corporation, which is based in Nagoya, Japan. Cellebrite has fourteen offices around the world including business centers in Washington, D.C., Munich, and in Singapore. In 2021, the Cellebrite company was valued at approximately $2.4 billion.

== History ==
Logo as of 2005

Cellebrite was established in Israel in 1999 by Avi Yablonka, Yaron Baratz, and Yuval Aflalo. Ron Serber joined Cellebrite in 2001, and Yossi Carmil joined in 2004. They served as co-CEOs from 2005 until Ron Serber left the company in 2020. Carmil retired as CEO in 2024 and the position is held by Thomas Hogan.

Cellebrite first manufactured hardware and software offering compressive phone-to-phone data transfer devices, contact synchronization, and content transfer tools for mobile phones, intended for use by wireless carrier sales and support staff in retail stores.

In 2007, Cellebrite established an independent mobile forensics division aimed at producing digital forensics and intelligence tools for use by law enforcement, intelligence agencies, military branches, corporate security and investigations, law firms, and private digital forensic examiners. In the same year, Cellebrite was acquired by FutureDial Incorporated and one of its major shareholders, Sun Corporation in Japan.

In 2017, Cellebrite's Mobile Lifecycle division was rebranded as Mobilogy, which produces hardware and software for phone-to-phone data transfer, backup, mobile applications electronic software distribution, and data analysis tools. In 2019, Israeli Growth Partners (IGP) invested $110 million in Cellebrite. In January 2020, Cellebrite announced the acquisition of US-based BlackBag Technologies, Inc., a forensics company with a focus on computer forensics. The acquisition allowed Cellebrite to expand its digital intelligence solution offerings to include data collection tools from computers.

In April 2021, Cellebrite announced plans to go public via a merger with TWC Tech Holdings II Corporation, a blank check firm. With the merger, Cellebrite becomes a publicly listed company on Nasdaq under the new ticker symbol, "CLBT". The pro forma implied equity value of Cellebrite post-merger is approximately $2.4 billion. In July 2021, a group of civil society organizations signed a letter arguing that the company should not be allowed to go public before demonstrating compliance with human rights. In August 2021, Cellebrite announced the completion of the merger. The Nasdaq ticker symbols were renamed to CLBT and CLBTW on the announcement day.

In July 2024, Cellebrite announced that it was acquiring Cyber Technology Services, a cybersecurity company based in Tyson's Corner, Virginia and licensed to work on federal projects with maximum security clearance. In June 2025, Cellebrite acquired Corellium, a Delray Beach, Florida -based startup specializing in virtualized mobile device environments for security research, for $200 million. The deal included $150 million in cash, $20 million in restricted stock, and up to $30 million in performance-based cash tied to unspecified milestones over two years.

== Subsidiaries ==
- BlackBag Technologies, Inc.: U.S-based subsidiary
- Cellebrite Asia Pacific Pte Ltd: Singapore-based subsidiary
- Cellebrite Federal Solutions: U.S.-based subsidiary
- Cellebrite Global Training Headquarters: U.S.-based subsidiary
- Cellebrite GmbH: Germany-based subsidiary - registered in October 2008
- Cellebrite UK Limited: UK based subsidiary

== Technology ==
Cellebrite's products are classified as "dual-use civilian services," and not security-related, a distinction, which it is argued allows them to operate without serious oversight from the Israeli government.

In 2007, Cellebrite introduced the first version of their Universal Forensic Extraction Device (or UFED), a portable tool capable of extracting the contents of a cell phone, which became popular with law enforcement agencies around the world. In 2019, Cellebrite announced a new version of their flagship UFED product called UFED Premium. The company claimed that it can unlock iOS devices including those running iOS 12.3 and Android phones such as the Galaxy S9.

In 2021, Moxie Marlinspike, creator of the encrypted messaging app Signal, pointed to several vulnerabilities in Cellebrite's UFED and Physical Analyzer software that allowed for arbitrary code execution on Windows computers running the software. One exploit he detailed involved the UFED scanning a specially formatted file, which could then be used to execute arbitrary code on the computer running the UFED. Marlinspike wrote that the code could then "[modify] not just the Cellebrite report being created in that scan, but also "all previous and future generated Cellebrite reports" from all previously scanned devices and all future scanned devices in any arbitrary way." Marlinspike also found that Cellebrite software was bundled with out-of-date FFmpeg DLL files from 2012, which lacked over 100 subsequent security updates. Windows Installer packages, extracted from the Windows installer for iTunes and signed by Apple, were also found, which he said raised legal concerns. Cellebrite responded that the company "is committed to protecting the integrity of our customers' data, and we continually audit and update our software in order to equip our customers with the best digital intelligence solutions available." The report by Signal followed an announcement by Cellebrite in 2020 that it had developed technology to crack encrypted messages in the Signal app, a claim the company later retracted and downplayed. The announcement by Marlinspike raised questions about the integrity of data extracted by the software, and prompted Cellebrite to patch some of the vulnerabilities found by Signal and to remove full support for analyzing iPhones.

In 2026, Cellebrite forensic tools had been used alongside spyware deployment in at least one documented case in Serbia involving device unlocking and surveillance activities.

== Law enforcement and government assistance ==
=== Bangladesh ===
The software has been sold to the Rapid Action Battalion (RAB) in Bangladesh. After a connection between Cellebrite and the extrajudicial killings of the RAB was reported in 2021, Cellebrite announced they would cease selling products to the organization. It is likely the RAB can continue to use existing Cellebrite products they have already purchased.

=== Belarus and Russia ===
Cellebrite's UFED program was used to persecute the democratic opposition in Belarus and Russia; Vladimir Putin used the technology against his political opponents for many years. In March 2021, after finding out that technology was used in the Lyubov Sobol affair, a Jerusalem activist filed a lawsuit against the company in the Supreme Court of Israel. The company announced the termination of cooperation with Russia and Belarus shortly afterward. Nevertheless, in 2023, the phone of Dmitry Ivanov, an anti-war activist, was accessed by the FSB via Cellebrite products. In June 2026, Citizen Lab reported that Russian authorities had used Cellebrite forensic tools to access the iPhone of activist Andrey Pivovarov in June 2021, several months after Cellebrite said it had ended its contract with Russian government customers. The report said the tools were used to extract and analyze data from messaging apps including WhatsApp, Telegram and Viber, while Cellebrite said any post-March 2021 use in Russia was unauthorized and involved hardware sold before the company cut ties.

=== Botswana ===
In May 2021, the Committee to Protect Journalists reported that police in Botswana used a UFED device sold by Cellebrite to extract data from the phone of journalist Oratile Dikologang, the digital editor and co-founder of the Botswana People's Daily News website after a senior office ordered that his device be searched for information about "offensive" Facebook posts.

=== Brazil ===
In March 2021, the Civil Police of Rio de Janeiro State opened an investigation into the mysterious death of 4-year-old Henry Borel. The boy's stepfather Jairinho and his mother Monique Medeiros were arrested for obstructing the investigation into the boy's death and were being investigated for homicide. Rio de Janeiro police used Cellebrite devices to extract deleted WhatsApp messages between Jairinho, Medeiros, and Henry's nanny, which the department described as "essential technical evidence" for the case.

=== European Union ===
In 2019, Cellebrite advertised their products as an effective way to control immigration from refugees in the European Union, saying that 77% of refugees arrived in Europe without documentation, although 43% had a smartphone.

=== Hong Kong ===
In August 2020, MIT Technology Review reported that Cellebrite sold its services to the Hong Kong Police Force for use in unlocking phones of detained demonstrators during the 2019–20 Hong Kong protests. As of October 7, 2020, the company announced that it would stop selling its solutions and services to customers in Hong Kong and China as a result of a change in U.S. regulations. However, in 2021 The Intercept said that the software was still being sold to China.

=== Jordan ===
A Citizen Lab forensic analysis found that Jordanian authorities have used Cellebrite to extract data from the phones of political activists and civilians without their consent, due to their involvement in the protests in support of Palestinians in Gaza between late 2023 and mid-2025.

=== Latvia ===
In 2024, the State Revenue Service (VID) of Latvia acquired Cellebrite software for €427,270 to combat tax evasion and the shadow economy. The software enables the analysis of financial information and electronic records, facilitating data collection and correlation studies during targeted control measures. Cellebrite is used to extract data from iOS and Android devices, limited to specific entities identified as high-risk for tax evasion, requiring physical access by tax inspectors.

=== Morocco ===
In 2020, the DGST used Cellebrite to extract the data from the iPhone of the investigative journalist and human rights activist Omar Radi.

=== Myanmar ===
In 2021, the New York Times reported that Myanmar's state budget included MacQuisition, a forensic software product made by a Cellebrite subsidiary, BlackBag Technologies, that is used to extract data from Apple computers. Court documents also showed that police in Myanmar reported using Cellebrite forensic technology to obtain data from the phones of two Reuters journalists, who were tried and convicted in 2018 for publishing evidence of the Rohingya massacre in Myanmar in 2017. A spokesperson for Cellebrite said that Cellebrite stopped selling to Myanmar in 2018 and that BlackBag had not sold to Myanmar after being acquired by Cellebrite in 2020.

=== Philippines ===
The Philippines government under president Rodrigo Duterte was a purchaser of Cellebrite, and the company trained many of the country's government bodies, including some involved in the thousands of extrajudicial killings of the Philippine drug war. According to journalist Antony Loewenstein, Cellebrite cannot claim ignorance of its involvement in the killings.

=== Saudi Arabia ===
On September 16, 2020, Haaretz reported that Cellebrite had provided Saudi Arabia with mobile phone hacking services. The staff at Cellebrite demanded the Saudis send a government representative to meet one of their employees at King Khalid International Airport in Riyadh. After the demand, a representative of Cellebrite traveled to Riyadh in November 2019 for a hacking attempt on a phone in the possession of a Saudi Justice Ministry employee. The Cellebrite representative called for the authorities to let him pass through passport control without getting his passport stamped or his electronic equipment checked while remaining only under his possession. The hacker was supposed to head to an isolated hotel room from the airport, where the process was planned to be executed without any electronic surveillance. The Cellebrite representative then returned to the Riyadh airport to fly to London.

=== Serbia ===
In December 2024, Amnesty International reported that police in Serbia had used Cellebrite UFED tools to bypass security measures on an Android device belonging to Slaviša Milanov, an independent journalist from Dimitrovgrad, as well as on devices belonging to environmental activists in the country. They then installed a novel form of domestically-produced spyware known as NoviSpy on the targeted devices. After the report, Cellebrite announced in February 2025 that it was halting the use of its digital forensics products by certain customers in Serbia.

=== Thailand ===
In October 2018, the Freeland Foundation, a global non-profit organization which fights wildlife and human trafficking, was called in to assist a Thai Police investigation into two Vietnamese males suspected of wildlife trafficking. Freeland's forensics experts were dispatched to the scene to provide on-the-job training. Using Cellebrite devices, police discovered evidence the poaching coordinators had arrived in Thailand to sponsor targeted hunting in Thailand, Malaysia, and possibly Myanmar.

=== United Kingdom ===
In November 2015, 15-year-old Kayleigh Haywood from Measham, England was found dead. Leicestershire Police used a Cellebrite device to unlock Kayleigh's badly damaged smartphone, which led them to whom she had been talking and their whereabouts. This evidence uncovered Kayleigh's murderer, Stephen Beardman, and her groomer, Luke Harlow. It cleared a suspect who was nowhere near the scene of the crime at the time of her murder.

In 2024, seven UK government agencies signed contracts with Cellebrite, including three police agencies, London's city authority, and the UK Foreign Office, which collectively spent $370,000 on contracts for Cellebrite services.

=== United States ===
In April 2011, the Michigan chapter of the American Civil Liberties Union questioned whether Michigan State Police (MSP) troopers were using Cellebrite UFEDs to conduct unlawful searches of citizens' cell phones. MSP refused to grant the ACLU of Michigan's 2008 Freedom of Information Act request unless the organization paid $544,000 to retrieve the reports. MSP issued a statement claiming that it honored the Fourth Amendment while searching mobile devices.

In March 2016, it was reported that Cellebrite offered to unlock an iPhone involved in the Apple-FBI encryption dispute. Later, after the FBI announced that it had successfully accessed the iPhone thanks to a third party, a press report claimed Cellebrite had assisted in unlocking the device, which an FBI source denied.

In 2017, Cellebrite entered into a contract with U.S. Immigration and Customs Enforcement (ICE) for $2.2 million. On June 24, 2019, another contract was signed with ICE for between $30 and $35 million. The 2019 contract was for "universal forensic extraction devices (UFED), accessories licenses, training and support services" for a year, with an option to extend for up to five years. In 2025, a new contract for $11 million was signed.

In July 2024, the FBI gained access to the phone of Thomas Crooks, the man who tried to assassinate presidential candidate Donald Trump, using unreleased technology from Cellebrite. After initial attempts with existing Cellebrite software failed, the FBI received newer still-in-development software from them, which enabled them to unlock the phone.

==== Relationship with ICE ====
In September 2025, the Department of Homeland Security renewed an $11 million contract with Cellebrite for software which can unlock phones and take complete images of all data on the phone including apps, location, history, photos, notes, call records, text messages, WhatsApp messages, and encrypted messaging app data including Signal. The app has primarily been used by Immigration and Customs Enforcement agents, but has also been used by Customs and Border Protection, Secret Service, and Transportation Security Administration agents.

== Security breaches ==
On January 12, 2017, it was reported that an unknown hacker had acquired 900 GB worth of confidential data from Cellebrite's external servers. The data dump includes alleged usernames and passwords for logging into Cellebrite databases connected to the company's my.cellebrite domain, and contains what appear to be evidence files from seized mobile phones and logs from Cellebrite devices. The data suggested Cellebrite sold its data extraction products to countries including Turkey, the United Arab Emirates, and Russia.
