= XRY (software) =

Digital mobile device forensics software

XRY is a digital forensics and mobile device forensics product by the Swedish company MSAB used to analyze and recover information from mobile devices such as mobile phones, smartphones, GPS navigation tools and tablet computers. It consists of a hardware device with which to connect phones to a PC and software to extract the data.

XRY is designed to recover the contents of a device in a forensic manner so that the contents of the data can be relied upon by the user. Typically it is used in civil/criminal investigations, intelligence operations, data compliance and electronic discovery cases. The software is available to law enforcement, military and intelligence agencies. It has become well known in the digital forensics community as one of their common tools for this type of work.

There are many more complex challenges when examining mobile phones in comparison to the forensic examination of normal computers. Many mobile phones have their own proprietary operating systems, which makes reverse engineering of such devices a very complex operation. The speed of the mobile device market also means that there are many more new devices being manufactured on a regular basis, so a mobile forensics tool must deal with all of these issues before being suitable for the task.

The XRY system allows for both logical examinations (direct communication with the device operating system) and also physical examinations (bypassing the operating system and dumping available memory). Whilst the logical recovery of data is generally better supported for more devices, physical examination offers the ability to recover more deleted information such as SMS text messages, images and call records etc. Because of the complexities of the topic, specialist training is usually recommended to operate the software.

The latest versions include support to recover data from smartphone apps such as the Android, iPhone and BlackBerry devices. Data recovered by XRY has been used successfully in various court systems around the world.

XRY has been tested by a number of different government organizations as suitable for their needs and is now in worldwide use.
