= Association of Prosecuting Attorneys =

American professional association

- Logo of the Association of Prosecuting Attorneys

- Formation: 2009
- Type: Legal society
- Tax ID no.: 26-3117485
- Headquarters: 11 DuPont Cir NW, Suite 501, Washington, D.C.
- Location: United States
- Chairperson: Jean Peters Baker
- Key people: David LaBahn, President and CEO
- Website: www.apainc.org

The Association of Prosecuting Attorneys (APA), founded in 2009, is a professional association of elected and appointed prosecutors in the United States. The APA's headquarters are in Washington, D.C.

== Purpose ==
The APA's defined objectives are to support prosecutors and enhance their ability to perform their duties.

The association's self-stated mission is also "to support and enhance the effectiveness of those in all areas of criminal justice and crime victim organizations in their efforts to create safer communities."

The APA is a registered national nonprofit organization that was founded in 2009.

== Programs ==
The APA oversees various programs to support the work of prosecutors in areas such as crime victim assistance, cruelty to animals, animal fighting, national security, gun violence, pre-trial services, juvenile justice, and domestic violence. The association provides training, technical assistance, and access to technology that aide in various prosecutorial functions.

Additionally, the association serves as an advocate for prosecutors in public policy matters; the APA also has potential partnerships with other justice organizations.

The APA has taken notable public stances on matters such as discovery, castle doctrine, gun violence, juvenile justice, pretrial process, continuous alcohol monitoring, and animal cruelty crimes.

== Governance ==
The APA is governed by a board of directors and managed by a president and chief executive officer (CEO).

The current chairperson of the board is Jean Peters Baker, Jackson County, Missouri district attorney. The current president and CEO is David LaBahn.

== See also ==
- American Bar Association
- Law practice management
- National Lawyers Guild
