= List of United States Supreme Court cases, volume 530 =

This is a list of all United States Supreme Court cases from volume 530 of the United States Reports:

Case name	Citation	Date decided
Hartford Underwriters Ins. Co. v. Union Planters Bank, N. A.	530 U.S. 1	2000
11 U.S.C. Section 506(c) does not provide an administrative claimant of a bankruptcy estate an independent right to seek payment of its claim from property encumbered by a secured creditor's lien.
Raleigh v. Illinois Dept. of Revenue	530 U.S. 15	2000
When the substantive law creating a tax obligation puts the burden of proof on a taxpayer, the burden of proof on the tax claim in bankruptcy court remains where the substantive law put it (in this case, on the trustee in bankruptcy).
United States v. Hubbell	530 U.S. 27	2000
Troxel v. Granville	530 U.S. 57	2000
Sims v. Apfel	530 U.S. 103	2000
Castillo v. United States	530 U.S. 120	2000
18 U.S.C. Section 924(c)(I) uses the word "machinegun" (and similar words) to state an element of a separate, aggravated crime.
Reeves v. Sanderson Plumbing Products, Inc.	530 U.S. 133	2000
Ramdass v. Angelone	530 U.S. 156	2000
Pegram v. Herdrich	530 U.S. 211	2000
Harris Trust and Sav. Bank v. Salomon Smith Barney Inc.	530 U.S. 238	2000
Section 502(a)(3)'s authorization to a plan "participant, beneficiary, or fiduciary" to bring a civil action for "appropriate equitable relief" extends to a suit against a nonfiduciary "party in interest" to a prohibited transaction barred by § 406(a).
Carter v. United States (2000)	530 U.S. 255	2000
Santa Fe Independent School Dist. v. Doe	530 U.S. 290	2000
Miller v. French	530 U.S. 327	2000
Crosby v. National Foreign Trade Council	530 U.S. 363	2000
Arizona v. California	530 U.S. 392	2000
Dickerson v. United States	530 U.S. 428	2000
Apprendi v. New Jersey	530 U.S. 466	2000
California Democratic Party v. Jones	530 U.S. 567	2000
Mobil Oil Exploration & Producing Southeast, Inc. v. United States	530 U.S. 604	2000
Boy Scouts of America v. Dale	530 U.S. 640	2000
Hill v. Colorado	530 U.S. 703	2000
Mitchell v. Helms	530 U.S. 793	2000
Stenberg v. Carhart	530 U.S. 914	2000
United States v. Alaska	530 U.S. 1021	June 29, 2000
