= In re =

Latin for 'in the matter of'

In re, Latin for 'in the matter [of]', is a term with several different, but related, meanings.

== Legal use ==
In the legal system in the United States, In re is used to indicate that a judicial proceeding may not have formally designated adverse parties or is otherwise uncontested. In re is an alternative to the more typical adversarial form of case designation, which names each case as "Plaintiff v. (versus) Defendant", as in Roe v. Wade or Miranda v. Arizona.

In re is commonly used in case citations of probate and bankruptcy proceedings, such as the General Motors Chapter 11 reorganization, which was formally designated In re General Motors Corp. in court papers. The term is also sometimes used for consolidated cases, as with In re Marriage Cases. It was adopted by certain U.S. states, like California, when they adopted no-fault divorce to reflect the fact that the modern proceeding for dissolution of marriage was being taken out of the adversarial system. It is also used in juvenile courts, as, for instance, In re Gault.

The Bluebook, a legal citation and style guide used by American lawyers and law schools, describes In re as a "procedural phrase" and requires that citations use In re to abbreviate 'in the matter of', 'petition of', 'application of', and similar expressions.

== See also ==
- Reference question
