= Secure telephone =

Telephone that provides encrypted calls

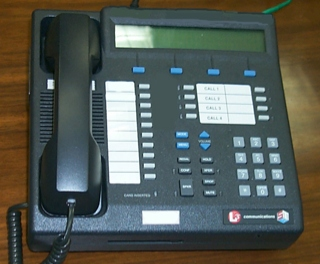
A Secure Terminal Equipment desk set

A secure telephone is a telephone that provides voice security in the form of end-to-end encryption for the telephone call, and in some cases also the mutual authentication of the call parties, protecting them against a man-in-the-middle attack. Concerns about massive growth of telephone tapping incidents led to growing demand for secure telephones.

The practical availability of secure telephones is restricted by several factors; notably politics, export issues, incompatibility between different products (the devices on each side of the call have to use the same protocol), and high (though recently decreasing) price of the devices.

== Well-known products ==
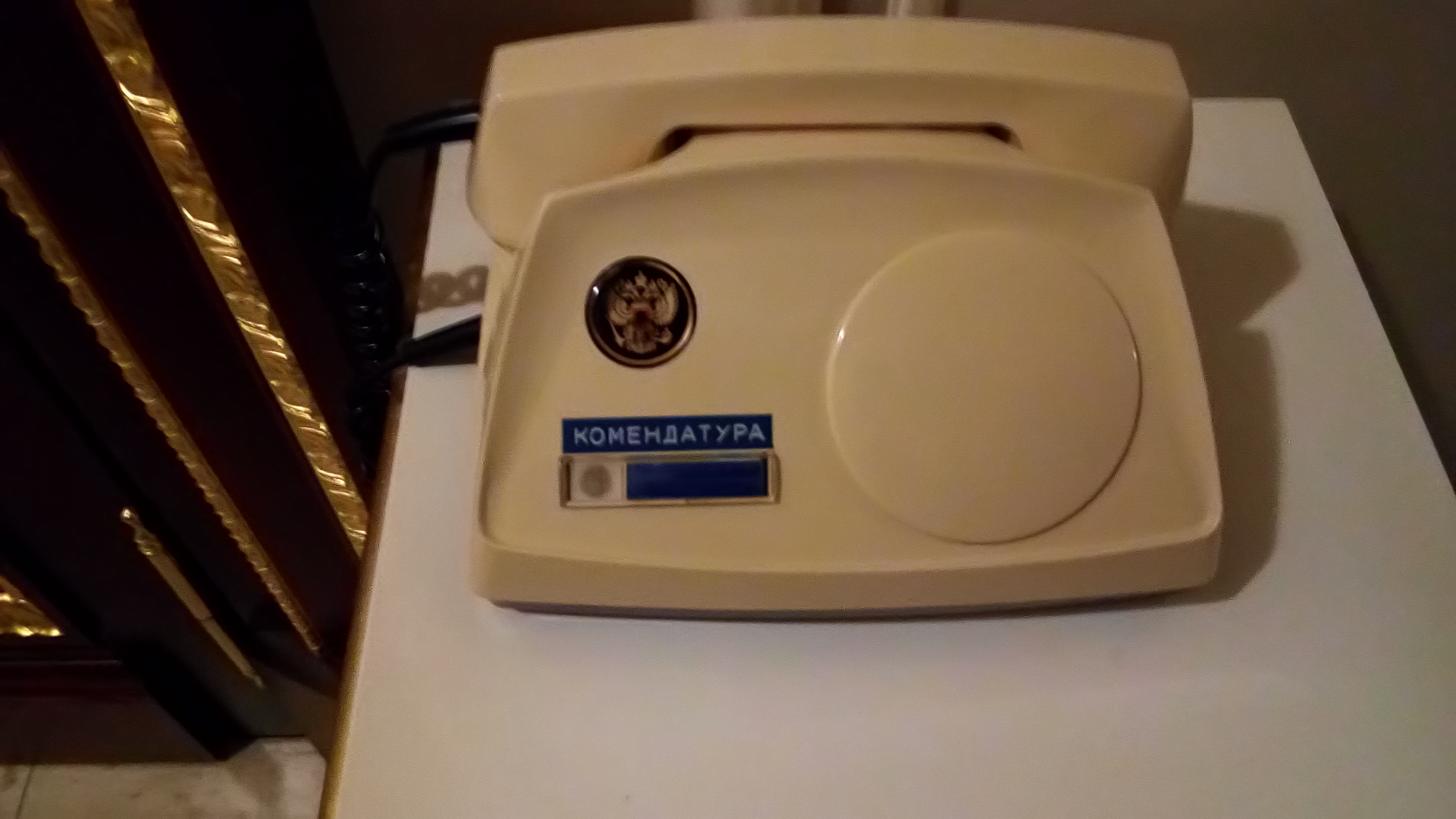
Secure telephone of the Commandant colloquially known as Vertushka at the Constantine Palace, one of the residences of the President of Russian Federation

The best-known product on the US government market is the STU-III family. However, this system has now been replaced by the Secure Terminal Equipment (STE) and SCIP standards which defines specifications for the design of equipment to secure both data and voice. The SCIP standard was developed by the NSA and the US DOD to derive more interoperability between secure communication equipment. A new family of standard secure phones has been developed based on Philip Zimmermann's VoIP encryption standard ZRTP.

== VoIP and direct connection phones ==
As the popularity of VoIP grows, secure telephony is becoming more widely used. Many major hardware and software providers offer it as a standard feature at no extra cost.

Examples include the Gizmo5 and Twinkle. Both of the former work with offerings from the founder of PGP, Phil Zimmermann, and his VoIP secure protocol, ZRTP. ZRTP is implemented in, amongst others, Ripcord Networks product SecurePC with up to NSA Suite B compliant Elliptic Curve math libraries. ZRTP is also being made available for mobile GSM CSD as a new standard for non-VoIP secure calls.

The U.S. National Security Agency is developing a secure phone based on Google's Android called Fishbowl.

== Historically significant products ==
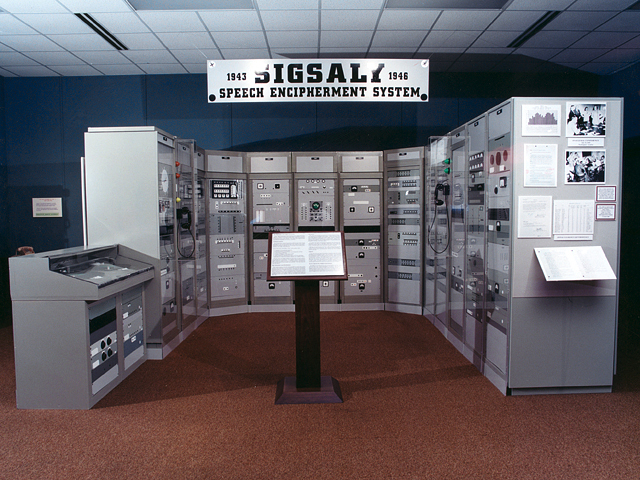
SIGSALY exhibit at the National Cryptologic Museum

Scramblers were used to secure voice traffic during World War II (1939-1945), but were often intercepted and decoded due to scrambling's inherent insecurity. The first true secure telephone (operational from 1943) was SIGSALY, a massive device that weighed over 50 tons. The NSA, formed in 1952, developed a series of secure telephones, including the STU-I of the 1970s, STU-II and STU-III, as well as voice-encryption devices for military telephones.

In 1989 an Irish company called Intrepid developed one of the most advanced secure phones. Called "Milcode", the phone was the first to implement code-excited linear prediction (or CELP) which dramatically improved voice quality and user-operability over previous LPC (Linear Predictive Coding) and LPC-10e versions.

Milcode also boasted significantly higher levels of security than previous secure telephones. The base model offered a proprietary encryption algorithm with a key-length of 512 bits, and a more advanced model with a key-length of 1024 bits. Key exchange used a public key, based on Diffie-Hellman, as opposed to a plug-in datakey. A new key was generated for each phone call. Milcode was also able to encrypt fax and data and was electromagnetically shielded to NATO TEMPEST standards.

Other products of historical significance are PGPfone and Nautilus (designed as a non-key escrow alternative to Clipper, now officially discontinued, but still available on SourceForge), SpeakFreely, and the security VoIP protocol wrapper Zfone (developed by Phil Zimmermann, who wrote the PGP software).

Scrambling, generally using a form of voice inversion, was available from suppliers of electronic hobbyist kits and is common on FRS radios. Analog scrambling is still used, as some telecommunications circuits, such as HF links and telephone lines in the developing world, are of very low quality.

== See also ==
- Microphone blocker
- Mobile phone tracking
- Secure Real-time Transport Protocol (SRTP)
- SCIP
- TETRA
- A5/1
- ZRTP
- Secure voice
