= PGP word list =

Words for conveying data bytes in speech

The PGP Word List ("Pretty Good Privacy word list", also called a biometric word list for reasons explained below) is a list of words for conveying data bytes in a clear unambiguous way via a voice channel. They are analogous in purpose to the NATO phonetic alphabet, except that a longer list of words is used, each word corresponding to one of the 256 distinct numeric byte values.

== History and structure ==
The PGP Word List was designed in 1995 by Patrick Juola, a computational linguist, and Philip Zimmermann, creator of PGP. The words were carefully chosen for their phonetic distinctiveness, using genetic algorithms to select lists of words that had optimum separations in phoneme space. The candidate word lists were randomly drawn from Grady Ward's Moby Pronunciator list as raw material for the search, successively refined by the genetic algorithms. The automated search converged to an optimized solution in about 40 hours on a DEC Alpha, a particularly fast machine in that era.

The Zimmermann–Juola list was originally designed to be used in PGPfone, a secure VoIP application, to allow the two parties to verbally compare a short authentication string to detect a man-in-the-middle attack (MiTM). It was called a biometric word list because the authentication depended on the two human users recognizing each other's distinct voices as they read and compared the words over the voice channel, binding the identity of the speaker with the words, which helped protect against the MiTM attack. The list can be used in many other situations where a biometric binding of identity is not needed, so calling it a biometric word list may be imprecise. Later, it was used in PGP to compare and verify PGP public key fingerprints over a voice channel. This is known in PGP applications as the "biometric" representation. When it was applied to PGP, the list of words was further refined, with contributions by Jon Callas. More recently, it has been used in Zfone and the ZRTP protocol, the successor to PGPfone.

The list is actually composed of two lists, each containing 256 phonetically distinct words, in which each word represents a different byte value between 0 and 255. Two lists are used because reading aloud long random sequences of human words usually risks three kinds of errors: 1) transposition of two consecutive words, 2) duplicate words, or 3) omitted words. To detect all three kinds of errors, the two lists are used alternately for the even-offset bytes and the odd-offset bytes in the byte sequence. Each byte value is actually represented by two different words, depending on whether that byte appears at an odd or an even offset from the beginning of the byte sequence. The two lists are readily distinguished by the number of syllables; the odd list has words of three syllables, the even list has two. The two lists have a maximum word length of 11 and 9 letters, respectively. Using a two-list scheme was suggested by Zhahai Stewart.

== Examples ==
Each byte in a bytestring is encoded as a single word. A sequence of bytes is rendered in network byte order, from left to right. For example, the leftmost (i.e. byte 0) is considered "even" and is encoded using the PGP Even Word table. The next byte to the right (i.e. byte 1) is considered "odd" and is encoded using the PGP Odd Word table. This process repeats until all bytes are encoded. Thus, "E582" produces "topmost Istanbul", whereas "82E5" produces "miser travesty".

A PGP public key fingerprint that displayed in hexadecimal as

E582 94F2 E9A2 2748 6E8B
061B 31CC 528F D7FA 3F19

would display in PGP Words (the "biometric" fingerprint) as

topmost Istanbul Pluto vagabond treadmill Pacific brackish dictator goldfish Medusa
afflict bravado chatter revolver Dupont midsummer stopwatch whimsical cowbell bottomless

The order of bytes in a bytestring depends on endianness.

== Other word lists for data ==
There are several other word lists for conveying data in a clear unambiguous way via a voice channel:

- the NATO phonetic alphabet maps individual letters and digits to individual words
- the S/KEY system maps 64 bit numbers to 6 short words of 1 to 4 characters each from a publicly accessible 2048-word dictionary. The same dictionary is used in RFC 1760 and RFC 2289.
- the Diceware system maps five base-6 random digits (almost 13 bits of entropy) to a word from a dictionary of 7,776 distinct words.
  - the Electronic Frontier Foundation has published a set of improved word lists based on the same concept
- FIPS 181: Automated Password Generator converts random numbers into somewhat pronounceable "words".
- mnemonic encoding converts 32 bits of data into 3 words from a vocabulary of 1626 words.
- what3words encodes geographic coordinates in 3 dictionary words.
- the BIP39 standard permits encoding a cryptographic key of fixed size (128 or 256 bits, usually the unencrypted master key of a Cryptocurrency wallet) into a short sequence of readable words known as the seed phrase, for the purpose of storing the key offline. This is used in cryptocurrencies such as Bitcoin or Monero.
- Like the PGP word list, the Bytewords standard maps each possible byte to a word. There is only one list, rather than two. The words are uniformly four letters long and can be uniquely identified by their first and last letters
