= PGPfone =

Secure voice telephony system

- Original author(s): Phil Zimmermann, Will Price
- Initial release: 1995
- Final release: 2.1 / 1997
- Written in: C, C++
- Operating system: Windows 95, Windows NT, Classic Mac OS
- Platform: x86, Motorola 68000 series
- Type: Encrypted telephony and VoIP
- License: Freeware (version 1), Proprietary (version 2)
- Website: https://web.mit.edu/network/pgpfone/

PGPfone was a secure voice telephony system developed by Philip Zimmermann in 1995. The PGPfone protocol had little in common with Zimmermann's popular PGP email encryption package, except for the use of the name. It used ephemeral Diffie-Hellman protocol to establish a session key, which was then used to encrypt the stream of voice packets. The two parties compared a short authentication string to detect a Man-in-the-middle attack, which is the most common method of wiretapping secure phones of this type. PGPfone could be used point-to-point (with two modems) over the public switched telephone network, or over the Internet as an early Voice over IP system.

In 1996, there were no protocol standards for Voice over IP. Ten years later, Zimmermann released the successor to PGPfone, Zfone and ZRTP, a newer and secure VoIP protocol based on modern VoIP standards. Zfone builds on the ideas of PGPfone.

According to the MIT PGPfone web page, "MIT is no longer distributing PGPfone. Given that the software has not been maintained since 1997, we doubt it would run on most modern systems."

== See also ==
- Comparison of VoIP software
- Nautilus (secure telephone)
- PGP word list
- Secure telephone
