= CMU Pronouncing Dictionary =

Machine-readable pronunciations

- Developer: Carnegie Mellon University
- Stable release: 0.7b / November 19, 2014; 11 years ago
- Available in: English
- License: BSD
- Website: www.speech.cs.cmu.edu/cgi-bin/cmudict

The CMU Pronouncing Dictionary (also known as CMUdict) is an open-source pronouncing dictionary originally created by the Speech Group at Carnegie Mellon University (CMU) for use in speech recognition research.

CMUdict provides a mapping orthographic/phonetic for English words in their North American pronunciations. It is commonly used to generate representations for speech recognition (ASR), e.g. the CMU Sphinx system, and speech synthesis (TTS), e.g. the Festival system. CMUdict can be used as a training corpus for building statistical grapheme-to-phoneme (g2p) models that will generate pronunciations for words not yet included in the dictionary.

The most recent release is 0.7b; it contains over 134,000 entries. An interactive lookup version is available.

== Database format ==
The database is distributed as a plain text file with one entry to a line in the format "WORD <pronunciation>" with a two-space separator between the parts. If multiple pronunciations are available for a word, variants are identified using numbered versions (e.g. WORD(1)). The pronunciation is encoded using a modified form of the ARPABET system, with the addition of stress marks on vowels of levels 0, 1, and 2. A line-initial ;;; token indicates a comment. A derived format, directly suitable for speech recognition engines is also available as part of the distribution; this format collapses stress distinctions (typically not used in ASR).

The following is a table of phonemes used by CMU Pronouncing Dictionary.

Vowels
ARPABET	Rspl.	IPA	Example
AA	ah	ɑ	odd
AE	a	æ	at
AH0	ə	ə	about
AH	uh	ʌ	hut
AO	aw	ɔ	ought, story
AW	ow	aʊ	cow
AY	eye	aɪ	hide
EH	eh	ɛ	Ed

Vowels
ARPABET	Rspl.	IPA	Example
ER	ur, ər	ɝ, ɚ	hurt
EY	ay	eɪ	ate
IH	i, ih	ɪ	it
IY	ee	i	eat
OW	oh	oʊ	oat
OY	oy	ɔɪ	toy
UH	uu	ʊ	hood
UW	oo	u	two

Stress
AB	Description
0	No stress
1	Primary stress
2	Secondary stress

Consonants
ARPABET	Rspl.	IPA	Example
B	b	b	be
CH	ch, tch	tʃ	cheese
D	d	d	dee
DH	dh	ð	thee
F	f	f	fee
G	g	ɡ	green
HH	h	h	he
JH	j	dʒ	gee

Consonants
ARPABET	Rspl.	IPA	Example
K	k	k	key
L	l	l	lee
M	m	m	me
N	n	n	knee
NG	ng	ŋ	ping
P	p	p	pee
R	r	ɹ	read
S	s, ss	s	sea

Consonants
ARPABET	Rspl.	IPA	Example
SH	sh	ʃ	she
T	t	t	tea
TH	th	θ	theta
V	v	v	vee
W	w, wh	w	we
Y	y	j	yield
Z	z	z	zee
ZH	zh	ʒ	seizure

== History ==
Version	Release date	License
0.1	16 September 1993	Public Domain
0.2	10 March 1994	Public Domain
0.3	28 September 1994	Public Domain
0.4	8 November 1995	Public Domain
0.5	No public release	Public Domain
0.6	11 August 1998	Public Domain
0.7	No public release	Public Domain
0.7a	18 February 2008	2-clause BSD
0.7b	19 November 2014	2-clause BSD
GitHub (unversioned)	26 May 2021	2-clause BSD

== Applications ==
- The Unifon converter is based on the CMU Pronouncing Dictionary.
- The Natural Language Toolkit contains an interface to the CMU Pronouncing Dictionary.
- The Carnegie Mellon Logios tool incorporates the CMU Pronouncing Dictionary.
- PronunDict, a pronunciation dictionary of American English, uses the CMU Pronouncing Dictionary as its data source. Pronunciation is transcribed in IPA symbols. This dictionary also supports searching by pronunciation.
- Some singing voice synthesizer software like CeVIO Creative Studio and Synthesizer V uses modified version of CMU Pronouncing Dictionary for synthesizing English singing voices.
- Transcriber, a tool for the full text phonetic transcription, uses the CMU Pronouncing Dictionary
- 15.ai, a real-time text-to-speech tool using artificial intelligence, uses the CMU Pronouncing Dictionary

== See also ==
- Moby Pronunciator, a similar project
