= Nautilus (secure telephone) =

Program to encrypt digital phone calls

Nautilus is a program which allows two parties to securely communicate using modems or TCP/IP. It runs from a command line and is available for the Linux and Windows operating systems. The name was based upon Jules Verne's Nautilus and its ability to overcome a Clipper ship as a play on Clipper chip. The program was originally developed by Bill Dorsey, Andy Fingerhut, Paul Rubin, Bill Soley, and David Miller.

Nautilus is historically significant in the realm of secure communications because it was one of the first programs which were released as open source to the general public which used strong encryption. It was created as a response to the Clipper chip in which the US government planned to use a key escrow scheme on all products which used the chip. This would allow them to monitor "secure" communications. Once this program and another similar program PGPfone were available on the internet, the proverbial cat was "out of the bag" and it would have been nearly impossible to stop the use of strong encryption for telephone communications.

The project had to move their web presence by the end of May 2014 due to the decision of Fraunhofer FOCUS to shut down the developer platform that hosted the project.
