= Master Password (algorithm) =

Algorithm for creating unique passwords

- Original author: Maarten Billemont
- Release: June 15, 2012; 14 years ago
- Stable release: 2.3 / April 19, 2015; 11 years ago
- Written in: Java, C, JavaScript
- Operating system: Microsoft Windows and Unix-like, including OS X, iOS and Android
- Available in: English
- Type: Password generator
- License: GNU General Public License
- Website: www.masterpassword.app
- Repository: www.gitlab.com/MasterPassword/MasterPassword

Master Password is a type of algorithm first implemented by Maarten Billemont for creating unique passwords in a reproducible manner. It differs from traditional password managers in that the passwords are not stored on disk or in the cloud, but are regenerated every time from information entered by the user: their name, a master password, and a unique identifier for the service the password is intended for (usually the URL).

By not storing the passwords anywhere, this approach makes it harder for attackers to steal or intercept them. It also removes the need for synchronization between devices, backups of potential password databases and risks of data breach. This is sometimes called sync-less password management.

== Algorithm ==
Billemont's implementation involves the following parameters:

- name: The username, used as a salt. The user's full name is chosen as it provides a sufficiently high level of entropy while being unlikely to be forgotten.
- master_password: The secret for generating the master key.
- site_name: A unique name for the service the password is intended for. Usually the bare domain name.
- counter: An integer that can be incremented when the service requests a new password. By default, it is 1.
- password_type: The password type defines the length and the constitution of the resulting password, see below.

=== Master key generation ===
In Billemont's implementation, the master key is a global 64-byte secret key generated from the user's secret master password and salted by their full name. The salt is used to avoid attacks based on rainbow tables. The scrypt algorithm, an intentionally slow key derivation function, is used for generating the master key to make a brute-force attack infeasible.

salt = "com.lyndir.masterpassword" + length(name) + name
master_key = scrypt(master_password, salt, 32768, 8, 2, 64)

=== Template seed generation ===
The template seed is a site-specific secret in binary form, generated from the master key, the site name and the counter using the HMAC-SHA256 algorithm. It is later converted to a character string using the password templates. The template seed makes every password unique to the website and to the user.

seed = hmac_sha256(master_key, "com.lyndir.masterpassword" + length(site_name) + site_name + counter)

=== Password generation ===
The binary template seed is then converted to one of six available password types. The default type is the Maximum Security Password, others can be selected if the service's password policy does not allow passwords of that format:

- Maximum Security Password (20 ASCII printable characters)
- Long Password (14 ASCII printable characters)
- Medium Password (8 ASCII printable characters)
- Short Password (4 ASCII printable characters)
- Basic Password (8 alphanumeric characters)
- PIN (4 digits)

== Implementations ==
Billemont also created multiple free software implementations of the Master Password algorithm, licensed under the GPLv3.:

- An app for iOS. The iOS implementation was first released in 2012.
- An app for Mac OS X
- An app for Android
- A Graphical desktop application written in Java
- A command-line application written in C
- A browser plugin for Firefox and Chromium-based browsers
- A web client written in JavaScript.
