= Group key =

Cryptographic key that is shared between a group of users

In cryptography, a group key is a cryptographic key that is shared between a group of users. Typically, group keys are distributed by sending them to individual users, either physically, or encrypted individually for each user using either that user's pre-distributed private key.

A common use of group keys is to allow a group of users to decrypt a broadcast message that is intended for that entire group of users, and no one else.

For example, in the Second World War, group keys (known as "iodoforms", a term invented by a classically educated non-chemist, and nothing to do with the chemical of the same name) were sent to groups of agents by the Special Operations Executive. These group keys allowed all the agents in a particular group to receive a single coded message.

In present-day applications, group keys are commonly used in conditional access systems, where the key is the common key used to decrypt the broadcast signal, and the group in question is the group of all paying subscribers. In this case, the group key is typically distributed to the subscribers' receivers using a combination of a physically distributed secure cryptoprocessor in the form of a smartcard and encrypted over-the-air messages.
