= Scamizdat =

Scamizdat, a portmanteau of the words scam and samizdat, was the name given by Grady Ward to a series of articles containing the writings of the Church of Scientology, both confidential and non-confidential, that were anonymously posted to the newsgroup alt.religion.scientology in 1995. Scamizdat was a major facet of the Scientology versus the Internet controversy, and the true identity of the person or persons responsible is still unknown.

The Scamizdat articles were wholesale copies of articles, books, and confidential briefings to which the Church of Scientology claimed copyright. As the articles were posted via anonymous remailer, it was not possible to determine the true identity of the poster or posters. In 1996, the Religious Technology Center, an arm of the Church of Scientology responsible for policing its intellectual property, sued a critic named Grady Ward (Religious Technology Center v. Ward 1996), alleging that he was responsible for Scamizdat. Grady Ward had been particularly vocal in taunting the Church online for its inability to stop Scamizdat, and had publicly requested that people send him confidential writings of the Church of Scientology on several occasions, although he denied any intention to use the material in a way that infringed copyright. The lawsuit was eventually settled with stipulated judgment being entered in favor of RTC, but no admission of liability by Grady Ward.
