= Grady Ward =

American lexicographer and Internet activist (born 1951)

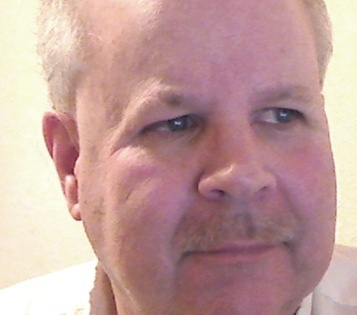
- March 11, 2013 Arcata, California
- Born: April 4, 1951 (age 75)

William Grady Ward (born April 4, 1951) is an American software engineer, lexicographer, and Internet activist who has been prominent in the Scientology versus the Internet controversy.

== Biography ==
Grady Ward created the Moby Project, an extensive compilation of English language lexical resources, and in 1996 released it to the public domain. One of its components, Moby Thesaurus, has more than 2.5 million synonyms and related words, making it the largest thesaurus in the English language as of early 2006. Previously, Ward was known for compiling and distributing a public domain version of the complete works of William Shakespeare, Moby Shakespeare, which has been credited as being the most widely distributed works of Shakespeare in the world.

In 1993, his publisher, the Austin Code Works, was investigated for the export of strong cryptography; the US government at the time treated cryptographic software above a certain strength as the legal equivalent of munitions and restricted them accordingly. Ward spent time developing source code fragments collectively titled Moby Crypto to encourage the pervasive development of programs containing state-of-the-art cryptography. He also promoted the idea of creating secure, memorable pass-phrases through "shocking nonsense." On 30 March 1995 he aided in the distribution of an NSA employee handbook when it was leaked by the on-line magazine Phrack arguing that, if the government could not keep safe its own materials, then there was no reason for anyone to trust them to maintain a secure key escrow scheme the NSA had proposed.

In 1996 the Church of Scientology sued Ward, alleging that he was responsible for anonymous postings of material to which the Church claimed copyright. After several years of litigation in which Ward defended pro per in forma pauperis and responded to more than 1000 docket items in the Northern District of California, San Jose, the lawsuit was eventually settled on 12 May 1998. Ward prevailed on the Church's trade secret claim resulting in a dismissal with prejudice, but agreed to a stipulated judgement on its copyright claim. Without a finding of liability by Ward, he agreed to pay the Church $200 a month for life. Unusually for legal settlements with the Church of Scientology, the settlement was not secret, and contained no restrictions on what Ward could say about Scientology. The settlement itself became a source of ongoing legal dispute with two appeals to the Ninth Circuit Court of Appeals.

On February 16, 2012, Grady Ward published a novel, The Celestial Instructi0n, detailing a fictional attack on the United States information infrastructure.

== See also ==
- PGP word list
- Scamizdat
