= Key signing party =

Event where people sign each other's PGP key

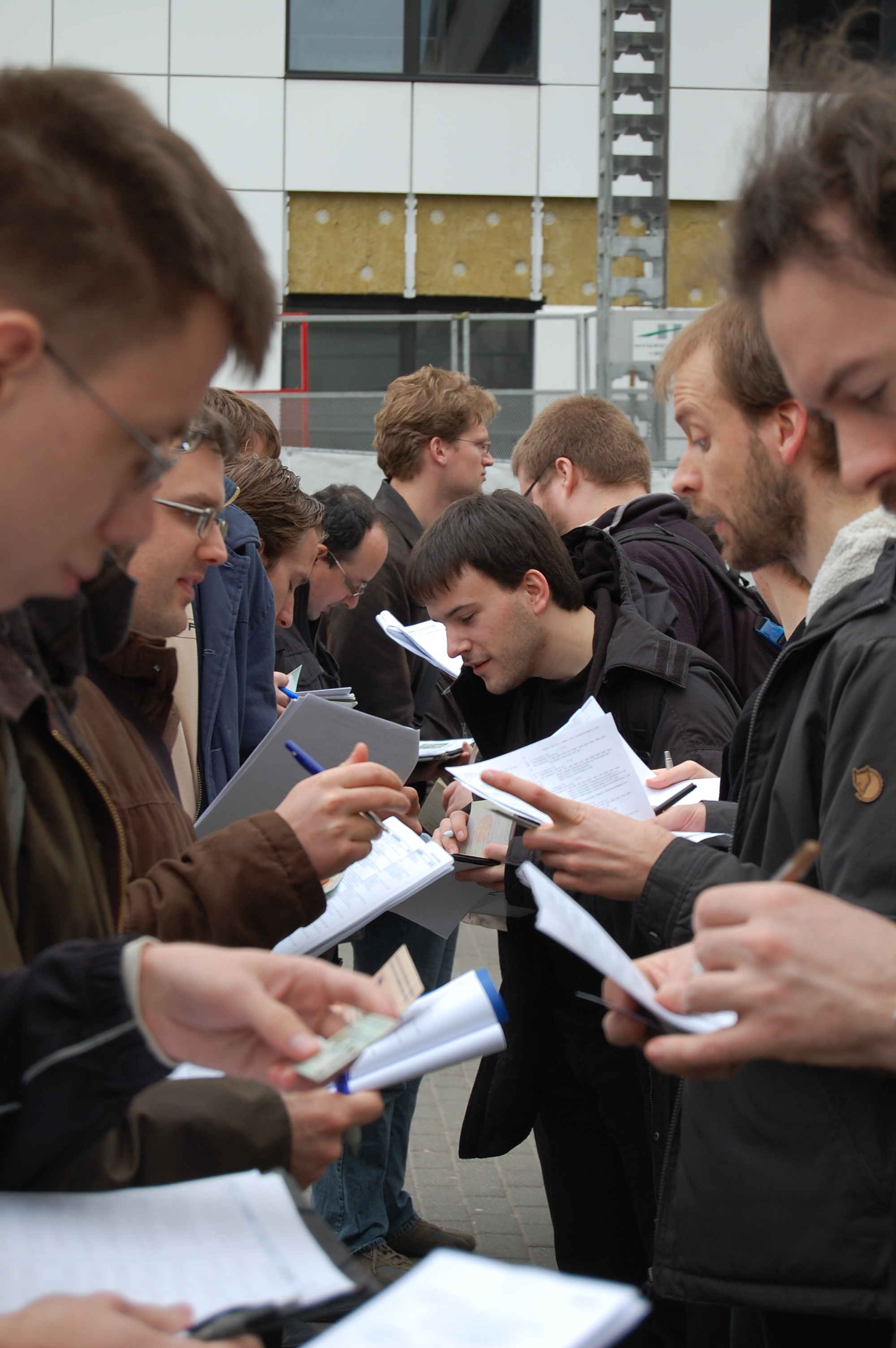
Key signing at FOSDEM 2008.

In public-key cryptography, a key signing party is an event at which people present their public keys to others in person, who, if they are confident the key actually belongs to the person who claims it, digitally sign the certificate containing that public key and the person's name, etc. Key signing parties are common within the PGP and GNU Privacy Guard community, as the PGP public key infrastructure does not depend on a central key certifying authority and instead uses a distributed web of trust approach. Key signing parties are a way to strengthen the web of trust. Participants at a key signing party are expected to present adequate identity documents.

Although PGP keys are generally used with personal computers for Internet-related applications, key signing parties themselves generally do not involve computers, since that would give adversaries increased opportunities for subterfuge. Rather, participants write down a string of letters and numbers, called a public key fingerprint, which represents their key. The fingerprint is created by a cryptographic hash function, which condenses the public key down to a string which is shorter and more manageable. Participants exchange these fingerprints as they verify each other's identification. Then, after the party, they obtain the public keys corresponding to the fingerprints they received and digitally sign them.

== See also ==
- Zimmermann–Sassaman key-signing protocol
- Web of trust
- CryptoParty
