= PGP Corporation =

Computer software company

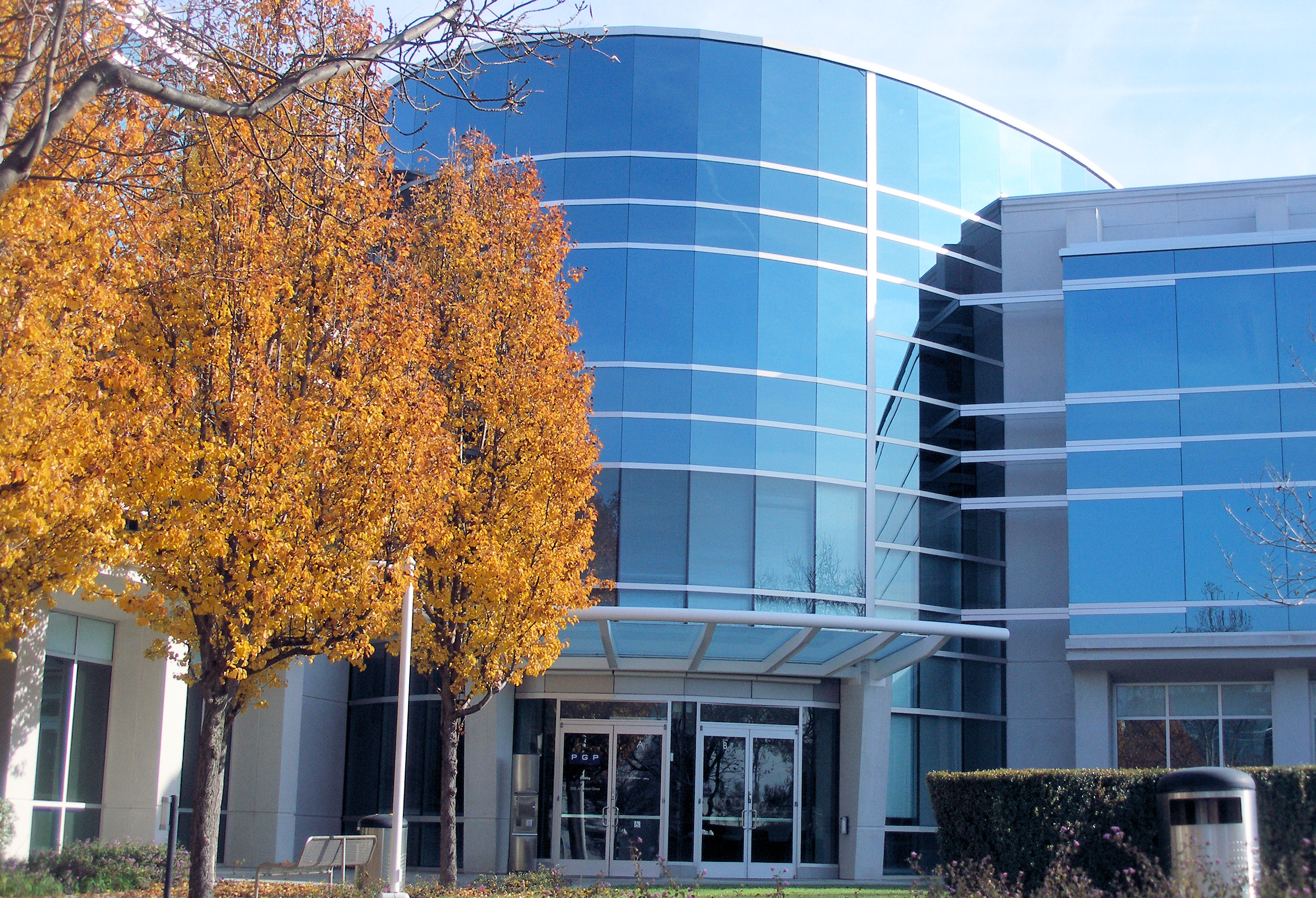
- PGP Corporation's former headquarters in Menlo Park (which later became home to Instagram)
- Type: Subsidiary
- Industry: Computer Software
- Founded: 2002; 24 years ago Menlo Park, California, U.S.
- Headquarters: Menlo Park, Salt Lake City, London, Frankfurt, Tokyo
- Products: Encryption applications and management platform
- Number of employees: 225 (2006)
- Parent: Broadcom
- Website: web.archive.org/web/20041230152556/http://www.pgp.com/

PGP Corporation was a company that sold Pretty Good Privacy computer software. It was founded in 2002, and acquired by Symantec in 2010, and by Broadcom in 2019.

== History ==
PGP Corporation was co-founded in June 2002 by Jon Callas and Phil Dunkelberger (who became CEO), based in Menlo Park, California. It was funded by Rob Theis, general partner, Doll Capital Management and Terry Garnett, general partner, Venrock Associates. The company owned the Pretty Good Privacy (PGP) software, which was originally developed by Phil Zimmermann (who had earlier started a company of a similar name). Originally written in 1991, PGP was one of the first freely and publicly available implementations of public-key cryptography. It was originally used to allow individuals to communicate securely through bulletin board systems. PGP later became standardized and supported by many other applications, including email. PGP Corporation acquired the code and rights to the name from Network Associates (NAI) in August 2002. The company released version 9 of the software in 2005.

PGP Corporation's focus shifted towards the corporate market. In 2004, the company announced plans to integrate with Symantec anti-virus technology.

In February 2010, the company acquired certificate authority TC TrustCenter and its parent company, ChosenSecurity, to form its PGP TrustCenter division.

On April 29, 2010, Symantec Corp. announced the acquisition of PGP Corporation for about $300 million cash. The merger was complete in June of that year.

On August 9, 2019, Broadcom Inc. announced they would be acquiring the Enterprise Security software division of Symantec, which includes PGP Corporation.
