= Random password generator =

Program that generates password from random number generator

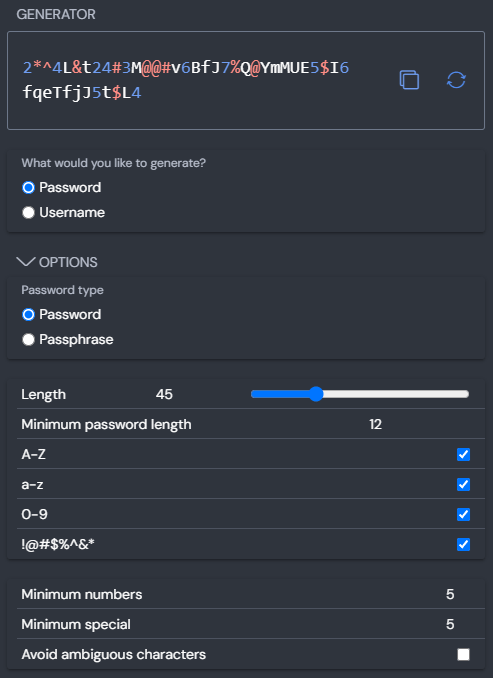
Random password generator in Bitwarden

A random password generator is a software program or hardware device that takes input from a random or pseudo-random number generator and automatically generates a password.

Mnemonic hashes, which irreversibly convert random strings into more memorable passwords, can substantially improve the ease of memorization. As the hash can be processed by a computer to recover the original 60-bit string, it has at least as much information content as the original string.

== Websites ==
=== Web Cryptography API ===
The Web Cryptography API is the World Wide Web Consortium’s (W3C) recommendation for a low-level interface that would increase the security of web applications by allowing them to perform cryptographic functions without having to access raw keying material. The Web Crypto API provides a reliable way to generate passwords using the crypto.getRandomValues() method. Here is the simple Javascript code that generate the strong password using web crypto API.

== FIPS 181 standard ==
Many computer systems already have an application (typically named "apg") to implement the password generator standard FIPS 181. FIPS 181—Automated Password Generator—describes a standard process for converting random bits (from a hardware random number generator) into somewhat pronounceable "words" suitable for a passphrase. However, in 1994 an attack on the FIPS 181 algorithm was discovered, such that an attacker can expect, on average, to break into 1% of accounts that have passwords based on the algorithm, after searching just 1.6 million passwords. This is due to the non-uniformity in the distribution of passwords generated, which can be addressed by using longer passwords or by modifying the algorithm.

== Mechanical methods ==
Yet another method is to use physical devices such as dice to generate the randomness. One simple way to do this uses a 6 by 6 table of characters. The first die roll selects a row in the table and the second a column. So, for example, a roll of 2 followed by a roll of 4 would select the letter "j" from the fractionation table below.

	1	2	3	4	5	6
1	a	b	c	d	e	f
2	g	h	i	j	k	l
3	m	n	o	p	q	r
4	s	t	u	v	w	x
5	y	z	0	1	2	3
6	4	5	6	7	8	9

== See also ==
- Cryptographically secure pseudorandom number generator
- Diceware
- Hardware random number generator
- Key size
- Master Password (algorithm)
- Password length parameter
- Password manager
