= Postage stamps of Ireland =

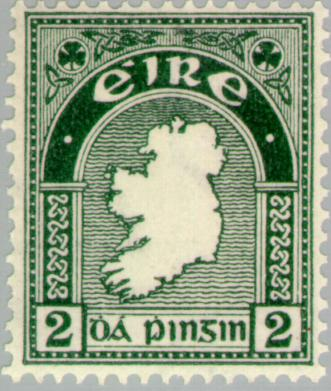
2d Map of Ireland: first Irish postage stamp

The postage stamps of the Republic of Ireland are issued by the country's postal operator. Ireland was part of the United Kingdom of Great Britain and Ireland when the world's first postage stamps were issued in 1840. These stamps, and all subsequent British issues, were used throughout Ireland until the new Irish Government assumed power in 1922. Beginning on 17 February 1922, existing British stamps were overprinted with Irish text to provide some definitives until separate Irish issues became available within the new Irish Free State. Following the overprints, a regular series of definitive stamps was produced by the new Department of Posts and Telegraphs, using domestic designs. These definitives were issued on 6 December 1922, the day that the Irish Free State officially came into existence; the first was a 2d stamp, depicting a map of Ireland (including Northern Ireland, which remained a part of the United Kingdom). Since then new images, and additional values as needed, have produced nine definitive series of different designs.

These were the major stamp productions for everyday use. Commemorative stamps first appeared in 1929, and these now appear several times a year, celebrating many aspects of Irish life, such as notable events and anniversaries, Irish life and culture, and many famous Irish people. Some definitive and commemorative stamps have been produced in miniature sheet, booklet and coil configurations in addition to the common sheet layout. Postage dues and airmails complete the stamp issues of the two, sequential, Irish stamp-issuing authorities. Two styles of watermark were used though the overprinted issues came with the watermarks of the British stamps provided for overprinting by the British Post Office.

Oifig an Phoist, the Irish Post Office, was the section of the Department of Posts and Telegraphs which issued all Irish stamps in Ireland up to 1984. After the division of the Department of Posts and Telegraphs into two semi-state organisations in 1984, An Post took over the responsibility for all Irish postal services including the issuing of postage stamps.

== Background ==
=== British stamps used in Ireland ===
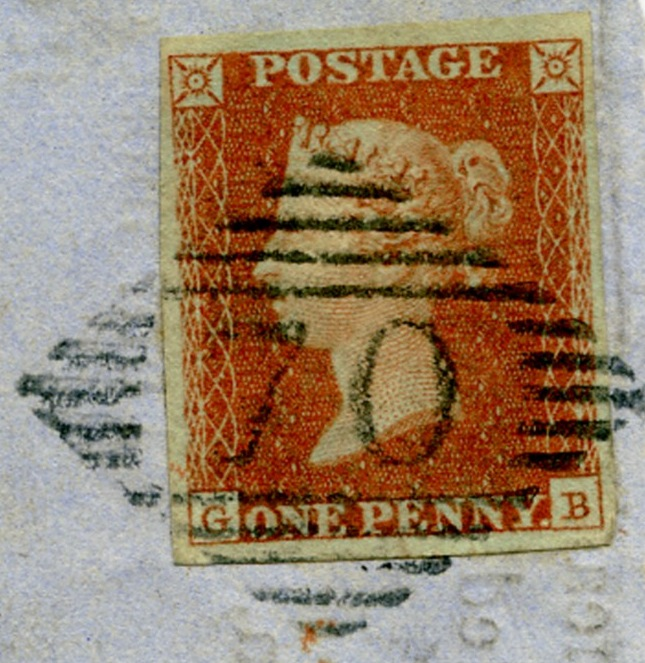
Numeral handstamp 70 identifying the Boyle post office, used on 1d red stamp in 1850

To identify postage stamps used in Ireland between 1840 and 1922, it is necessary to identify the postmark cancelling the stamp as being from an Irish town. Stamps used during this period are referred to as Great Britain used in Ireland.

From 1840 to 1844, the Penny Black, and other stamps issued, were obliterated with the Maltese Cross cancellation. There was no text or numeral to help identify any of these cancels as Irish, but some Maltese Crosses are uniquely identifiable with certain Irish towns, including Belfast, Eyrecourt, Cork, Hollymount, Limerick and Mullingar. From 1844 on, the cancels used included text or numerals that identified the post town. Cancels of both types are easier to identify if the stamp is still affixed to a cover, since this makes the complete postmark visible, but a stamp no longer affixed to a cover may still permit identification of the town of use if enough of the postmark can be seen on the stamp itself. Numerals of Irish town cancels were uniquely set in a 4 pointed diamond shape whereas town cancels in England and Wales used an oval shape and Scotland used a rectangular form.

=== Stamp issuing authorities ===
Between 1922 and 1983 Oifig an Phoist, the Irish Post Office, a section of the Department of Posts and Telegraphs ('the P. & T.'), issued all postage stamps in both the Irish Free State and the Republic of Ireland. During this time they employed some of the following companies to overprint or print the stamps: Dollard, Thom, Irish Government Printers, Waterlow and Sons (London), De La Rue and Co., Bradbury Wilkinson and Co., Ltd., (London), Harrison and Sons Ltd., (London) and Irish Security Stamp Printing Ltd. Since 1984, An Post has issued all Irish postage stamps. Most have been printed by Irish Security Stamp Printing Ltd., though a small number were printed by Harrison and Sons Ltd., (London), Questa, Walsall Security Printing, Prinset Pty Ltd., (Australia) and SNP Cambec (Sprintpak) (Australia).

=== Forerunners ===
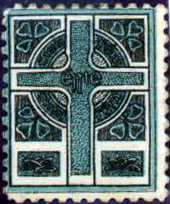
1907 Celtic Cross Sinn Féin propaganda label

In stamp collecting circles, the word forerunner usually describes a postage stamp used during the time period before a region or territory issues stamps of its own. However, in Irish reference books, such as Handbook of Irish Philately, the term forerunners usually refers to political and propaganda labels. These often resemble stamps, but few of them were used on Irish mail and they had no legal standing for mail in Ireland. Four values, 1c, 3c, 24c (deep-green), and 24c (mauve-purple) were produced in New York by the Irish veterans of the US Civil War and are known as the 1865–1867 Fenian issue. The 1893 colonial design are unofficial essays and are classed as bogus.

Between 1907 and 1916, Sinn Féin, one of the nationalist organisations of the time, issued propaganda labels symbolising Irish nationhood. Their use as stamps was forbidden by Post Office regulations. The first design was a Celtic Cross, similar to one later adopted for two definitive stamps of 1923, and the second depicts a female figure and harp in an oval frame. In 1912, labels inscribed "Imperial Union" appeared, with a design of a larger harp and female figure. These labels, expressing unionist sentiments, are believed to have been printed in Manchester as a counter to the Sinn Féin labels. After the Home Rule Bill for Ireland was passed in the Imperial Parliament at Westminster, an Irish Republican body issued labels in 1916 with the portraits of three nationalist heroes known as The Manchester Martyrs against an Irish tricolour background. Forgeries of these labels are common. Following the Easter Rising of 1916, American sympathisers printed eight ERIE PUIST labels showing portraits of seven prominent leaders and a harp and shamrock label. The misspelling ERIE for ÉIRE could have been because of hasty preparation.

The Irish Republican Army (IRA), that controlled much of the southern part of the country during the Irish Civil War, issued a 1d, 2d and 6d label, mainly because of a stamp shortage. These were printed in Cork and were to be put on sale in August 1922, but in the meantime the Irish Free State army landed near Cork and the IRA set fire to their own barracks before they retreated from Cork, destroying most of the labels.

=== Essays ===
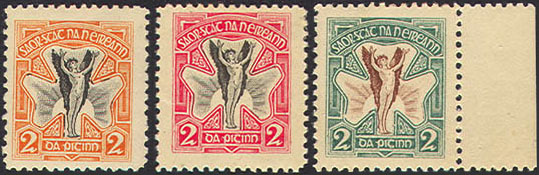
Three bi-colour Hely Ltd. essays

The Postmaster General of the Irish Free State issued an invitation to firms in Dublin and London on 1 February 1922 for the submission of designs for a permanent definitive stamp issue,and by March several designs had been submitted. The following companies and printers provided essays: Dollard Printing House Ltd., Hely Ltd., Perkins Bacon & Co., and O'Loughlin, Murphy & Boland.

== Postage stamps ==
=== Overprints ===
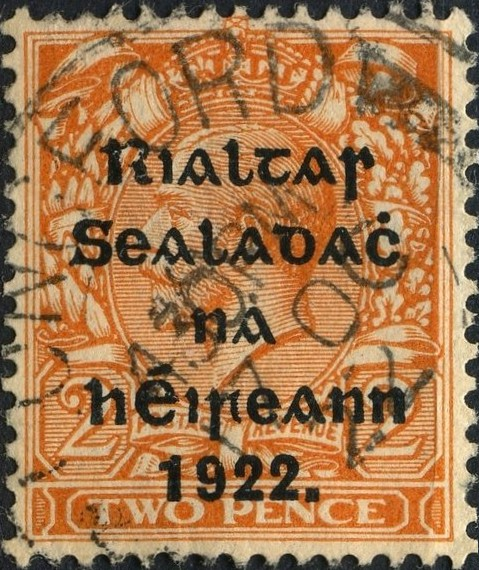
Postage stamps of the Provisional Government (Jan–Dec 1922) consisted of overprinted British stamps. The text in traditional Irish orthography reads Rialtas Sealadach na hÉireann 1922 and translates as Provisional Government of Ireland 1922.

In 1922, as an interim measure before the first specially designed definitives were ready, a series of contemporary stamps of King George V were overprinted. The unoverprinted stamps were issued and in use in the United Kingdom of Great Britain and Ireland between 1912 and 1922 and continued in use in Great Britain and Northern Ireland until 1936. Three printing firms held overprinting contracts: Dollard Printing House Ltd., Alex. Thom & Co Ltd., and Harrison & Sons. In June 1925 the Government Printers, Dublin Castle, obtained the contract and completed all overprinting until 1937, when the final, high-value stamps were issued. Unoverprinted postal stationery and labels remained on sale until 1925.

Collecting and identifying the overprints can be an arduous task as there are numerous variations in the overprint settings. Feldman states "the complex details of plating, shading, overprint colours, accurate measurements, to mention a few, often discourage even the most enthusiastic collector". Three specialised books, or catalogue chapters, (Freeman & Stubbs, Munk and Meredith), issued within five years of issue have concentrated on this topic and Meredith is regarded as unequalled.

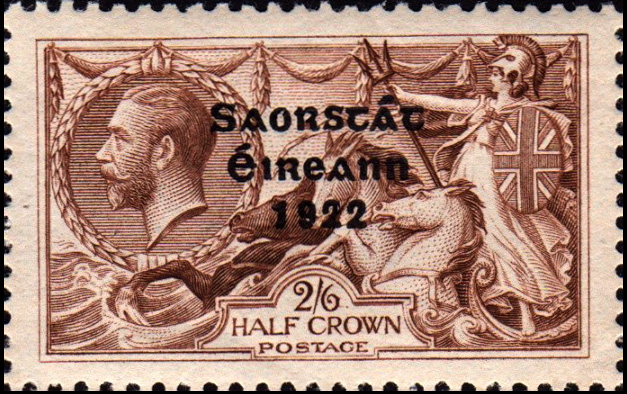
Irish Free State three-line overprint Saorstát Éireann 1922 on 2/6 King George V stamp engraved by J.A.C. Harrison

Three distinct overprints were made, before and after the formal independence of the state on 6 December 1922. The Provisional Government of Ireland (Rialtas Sealadach na hÉireann) overprints were initially issued on 17 February 1922, with eight low-value and three high-value stamps overprinted by Dollard and four by Thom. This overprint is composed of the four words Rialtas Sealadach na hÉireann and the numeral date 1922 arranged in five lines of seriffed text. The unoverprinted stamps remained valid for postage in what was to become the Irish Free State until 31 March 1922.

The second overprinted series also consisted of five lines, similar to the first series, and were released in a range of values from a half-penny to one shilling and were issued June–October 1922. These were overprinted by Thom and are easily distinguished from the first set by the sans-serif figures in "1922" and the full stop after the year, as per the picture above left.

The Irish Free State (Saorstát Éireann) overprints debuted on 11 December 1922, being the third set. This is a three-line overprint using a sans-serif typeface and was done by Thom, Harrison and the Government Printers. The last overprinted stamps were the Waterlow & Sons re-engraved King George V 2/6, 5/- and 10/- values that appeared in 1934 and were overprinted in 1937 for use in Ireland.

=== Name of state ===
On stamps, the name of the state has always been written in Irish and seldom written in English. The overprints were stamped first Rialtas Sealadach na hÉireann ("Provisional Government of Ireland") and later Saorstát Éireann ("Irish Free State"). Subsequent stamps nearly all used the name Éire ("Ireland"), even though this was not the official name of the state until the 1937 Constitution took effect. The exceptions were issued in 1949 and 1950, and used POBLAĊT NA hÉIREANN or Poblacht na h-Éireann ("Republic of Ireland"). This phrase is the official description of the state specified in the Republic of Ireland Act, which came into force in April 1949; the state's official name was not changed by the Act. Fianna Fáil defeated the outgoing government in the 1951 election and abandoned the use of the description, reverting to the name on stamps and elsewhere. Originally, Éire was written in Gaelic type; from 1952 to 1979, many stamps had the name of the state in Roman type, usually in all caps, and often written EIRE rather than ÉIRE, omitting the síneadh fada accent over the initial 'E'. In 1981 the Department of Posts and Telegraphs recommended the inclusion of the word "Ireland" along with "Éire" on stamps but the Department of the Taoiseach vetoed the idea on the basis it could cause "constitutional and political repercussions" and that "the change could be unwelcome."

=== Definitives ===
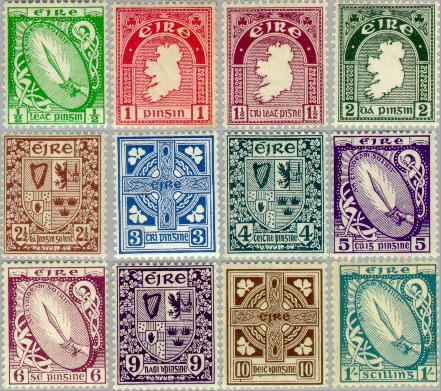
1922–23 First Definitive Series (low values)

Since 1922, nine Irish definitive stamp series have been released. Besides different designs, there were changes involving the watermark and eventually doing away with watermarked paper, changes in currency were also reflected on the stamps: decimalisation in 1971, and Euro changeover in 2002.

The first twelve stamps, the low values up to 1 shilling, were issued during 1922–1923, while the three high values, 2/6, 5/- and 10/-, did not appear until 8 September 1937. Designs included: Sword of Light, Map of Ireland, Celtic Cross, Arms of the Four Provinces and St. Patrick. Watermark and extra values were made until new designs, known as the Gerl definitives, using early Irish art motifs, were produced in 1968. These were the first new designs in 31 years for the high values and 46 years for the low values. The Gerl series was denominated initially in pre-decimal Irish pounds and later in decimal currency (both watermarked issues). It latterly appeared as unwatermarked stamps.

Between 1982 and 1988 a series based on Irish architecture through the ages was released, with line drawings by Michael Craig and graphics by Peter Wildbur. It contained twenty-eight stamps, with values ranging from 1p to £5. Stamps based on Irish cultural heritage followed between 1990 and 1995. Irish birds feature in the 1997 series that span the conversion of currency from the Irish pound, through dual currency to the introduction of the Euro. These were the first definitives where all values were printed in full colour. On 9 September 2004 new stamps, featuring flowers native to the woodlands and hedgerows of Ireland, become available. These were replaced in September 2010 by a seventh series featuring animals and marine life using photographic images.

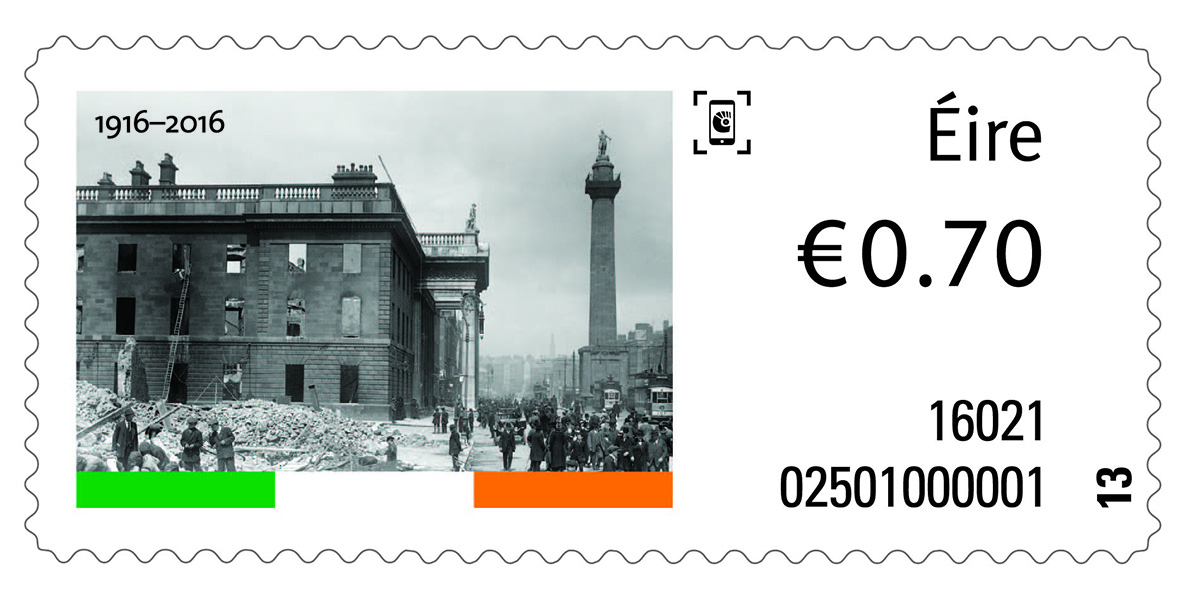
Stamp with photograph of destroyed General Post Office

For the centenary of the 1916 Easter Rising an eighth series of definitive stamps were issued on 21 January 2016 and will only be on sale for a period of one year. There are sixteen stamps divided into four groups of four categories named as: Leaders and Icons, Participants, Easter Week and The Aftermath.

Following the withdrawal of the limited edition 1916 commemoration definitives, the ninth series made its debut on 13 January 2017 with an initial twelve designs based on objects described in A History of Ireland in 100 Objects, a book by Fintan O'Toole. The introduction included eight different SOAR stamps (Stamps on a Roll), a range of coil stamps, and a domestic and a foreign rate stamp booklet that each illustrate different objects. Some of the objects illustrated are the Tara Torcs, Broighter Boat and Old Croghan Man Armlet. The balance of the series were to be issued over the next five years, and in July 2020, Phase IV of the ninth series were made available as eight new stamps illustrated the following objects: the Ballinderry Sword, the four-metre long Waterford Charter Roll, dating from 1215 to 1373, an original 15th or 16th century Gallowglass gravestone (extant in Clonca, County Donegal), the 1790s Robert Emmet's Ring, a 19th-century cooking pot from the National Museum of Ireland, a 1911 Titanic launch ticket, a washing machine and a Pentium processor.

Several Irish definitives have been issued in booklet and coil formats in addition to the normal sheet configuration.

=== Commemoratives ===
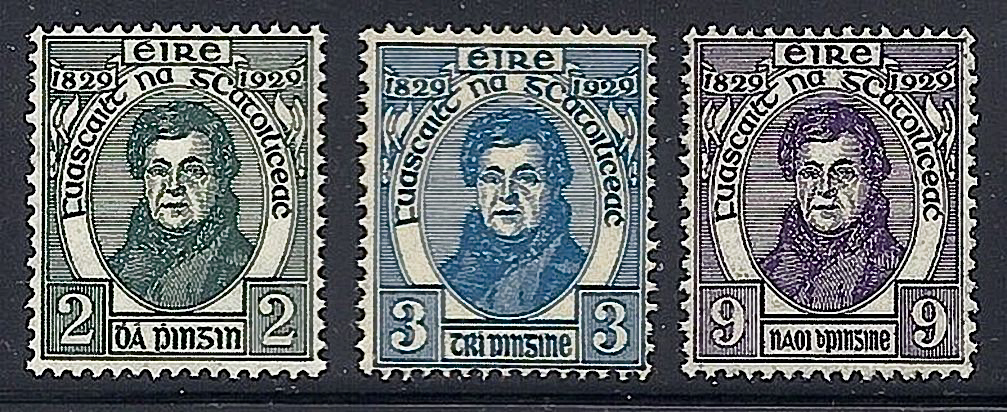
First commemorative stamps, issued in 1929

Irish postage stamps have been released to commemorate a wide variety of Irish topics, such as Irish notable events and anniversaries, aspects of Irish life and culture, famous Irish people (statesmen, religious, literary and cultural figures, athletes, etc.), fauna and flora, works of art, and Christmas. Europa postage stamps have been issued since 1960 to celebrate membership of the European Conference of Postal and Telecommunications Administrations (CEPT), and international events have also been commemorated, such as the Constitution of the United States in 1939 or more recently, in 2016, the World War I, Battle of the Somme.

The first commemorative, a set of three Daniel O'Connell stamps, appeared on 22 June 1929. Until the mid-1990s, with only three exceptions in 1943, 1977 and 1979 for Douglas Hyde, Louis le Brocquy and Pope John Paul II respectively, it was policy to not depict living persons. This policy has been put aside and since 1995 there have been several such issues, mainly depicting athletes; for instance 30 stamps were issued showing living Irish sportsmen for the Millennium and several golfers are shown on three 2006 Ryder Cup stamps. More recently, stamps have featured U2, Thin Lizzy and Irish rugby players and coach, such as Johnny Sexton and Joe Schmidt.

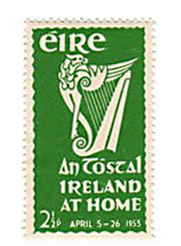
1953 two-pence halfpenny An Tóstal

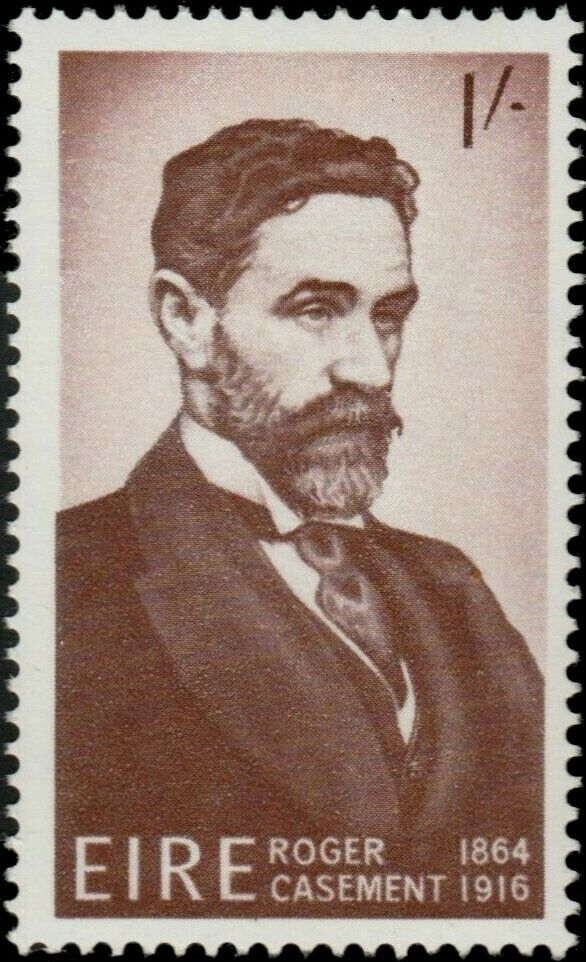
1966 executed Irish nationalist Roger Casement birth centenary

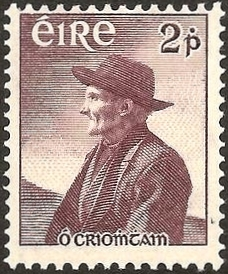
1957 birth centenary of author Tomás Ó Criomhthain

In September 2024 An Post published a collection of stamps honoring late Irish musicians Sinéad O'Connor, Shane MacGowan, Séamus Begley and Christy Dignam. Designed by Shaughn McGrath of Shaughn McGrath Creative, and printed in black and white, the four-stamp set marks the musicians’ passing and their unique contributions to Irish cultural life and music, entitled Iconic Irish Voices.

==== Miniature sheets ====
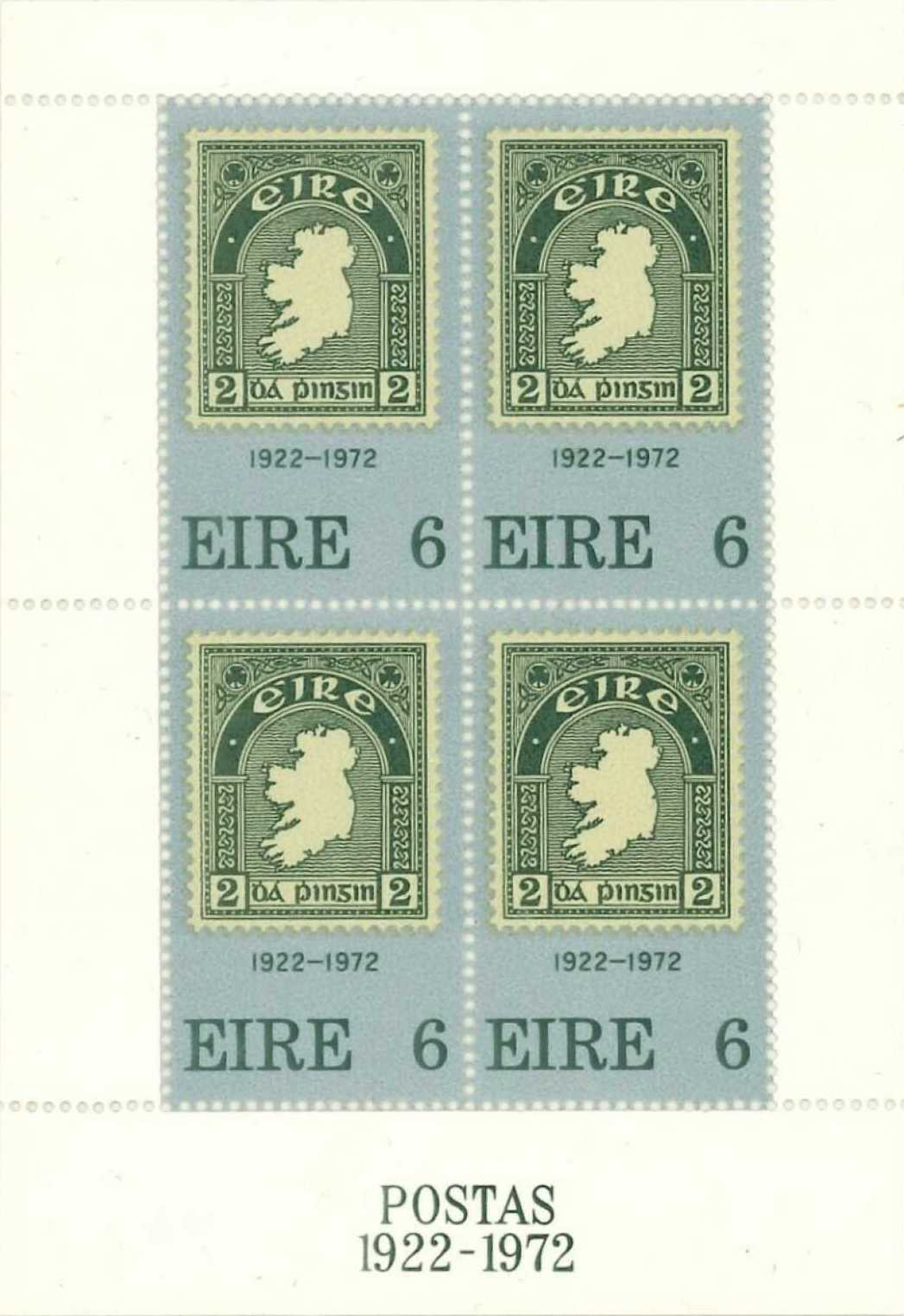
1972 Miniature sheet commemorating the 50th anniversary of independence

Some stamps were issued in the form of a miniature sheet comprising from one to fours stamps of a single, or multiple, design from one issue printed on the same sheet and sold in that format and up to July 2019, 114 miniature sheets had been issued. Larger sheets of up to sixteen are known as souvenir sheets. The miniature and souvenir sheets are most often produced in addition to the same designs issued as single stamps. The first miniature sheet of four stamp on stamp postage stamps was issued in 1972 to commemorate the 50th anniversary of the first Irish postage stamp. This was followed by a four-stamp sheet to commemorate the bicentenary of the United States Declaration of Independence; the stamps in this sheet were also available as single stamps. A set of four stamps showing Irish wildlife was issued in sheet form and also as single stamps in 1980. Since 1983 miniature sheets have been produced with increasing frequency, from an initial issue of one per year to multiple sheets more recently.

=== Airmails ===
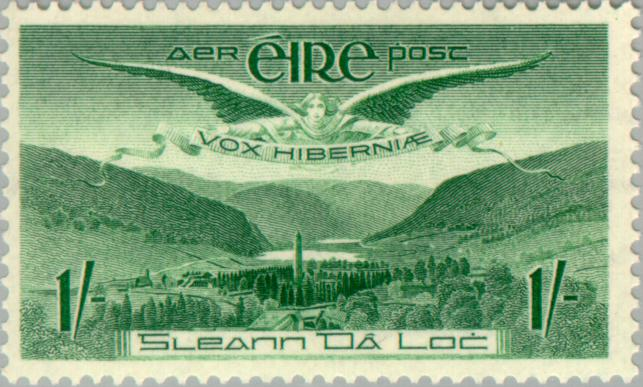
1 shilling airmail stamp – Vox Hiberniæ flying over Glendalough

Seven Irish airmail stamps were issued between 1948 and 1965 in the 1d, 3d, 6d, 8d, 1/-, 1/3 and 1/5 values. In 1968 they were withdrawn with the issuance of the second definitive stamp series. No specific airmail rate existed for the 1d and 3d stamps; all others paid a contemporaneous rate when first produced. These were the only airmail stamps ever issued but many definitives and commemoratives have been produced in values that paid the postage rate for airmail service. The stamps were designed by Richard J. King and recess printed by Waterlow and Sons, London, until 1961, and thereafter by De La Rue & Co, Dublin. The designs feature the Flight of the Angel Victor – Messenger of St. Patrick – carrying the Voice of the Irish 'Vox Hiberniæ' over the world flying over four well-known Irish historical landmarks, one from each of the four provinces of Ireland: Lough Derg (3d and 8d values), Rock of Cashel (1d, 1/3 and 1/5 values), Glendalough (1/- value) and Croagh Patrick (6d value). These were printed in sheets of 60 stamps with an 'e' watermark.

=== Postage dues ===
Surcharges imposed by the Irish post office on mail bearing insufficient pre-paid postage had the postage due collected by the use of these labels. Since 1925 there have been six series printed, with the design remaining the same until 1980, though the colour and watermarks have changed. The Irish word pingin, for penny, is used in both £.s.d and decimal currency, but because it has the same meaning in each, the value on the label does not indicate whether the label was issued before or after decimalisation. Hence, identifying the issue of a label requires further information: if collectors knows the date of use, the existence of a watermark and if so which type, and the specific colour, identification will be easier. For example, the 3d value was blue between 1940 and 1969, and stone colour from 1971 until 1980; it changed from a watermarked to a non-watermark paper in 1978. Additionally, the 1, 5 and 8 pence values are seen in two different colours depending on the issue, while the 1/2d, 1d, 2d and 6d are seen with both watermark varieties. Except for the sixth issue, which has the word Éire in the design, there is no explicit country identity on any of the others. The first four series use only Irish words.

==== Sterling issues ====
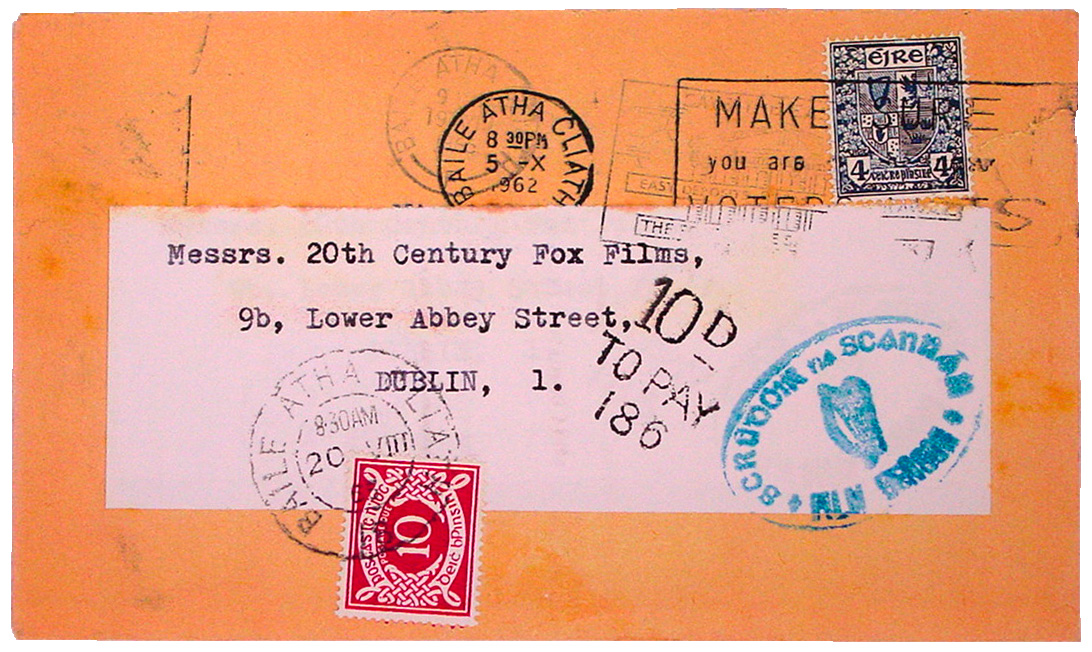
Reused 1962 envelope with 10d Second Issue postage due affixed to mail sent to local office of 20th century Fox with certifying cachet of IFCO in 1965

The first issue consisted of four values released on 20 February 1925; 1/2d, 1d, 2d and 6d. Typographed by the Government Printers in Dublin Castle on 'se' watermarked paper. The sheets were printed in larger sheets of 180 divided into three panes of 60 labels. The second issue had ten values: 1/2d, 1d, 1 1/2d, 2d, 3d, 5d, 6d, 8d, 10d and 1/-, and were printed on 'e' watermarked paper between 1940 and 1969. Other details are the same.

==== Decimal issues ====
A third issue was made up of seven labels and issued in decimal currency in the following values: 1p, 1 1/2p, 3p, 4p, 5p, 7p and 8p. In the fourth issue the 3p, 4p and 5p values were reissued in non-watermarked paper on 20 March 1978. A new design, printed by photogravure, and appeared on 20 June 1980 in ten values: 1p, 2p, 4p, 6p, 8p, 18p, 20p, 24p, 30p and 50p made up the fifth issue. The sheet format was two panes of 100 divided by a gutter margin. The sixth issue consisted of ten newly designed labels by Q Design and lithographically printed by ISSP on non-watermarked paper on 6 October 1988: the values were: 1p, 2p, 3p, 4p, 5p, 17p, 20p, 24p, 30p, 50p and £1. In 1993 an experimental franking machine was used as a short-lived replacement but no more postage dues or Euro denominated postage dues have been produced though between 1993 and 1997 though few such machine produced labels have been recorded in commercial usage.

=== Booklets ===
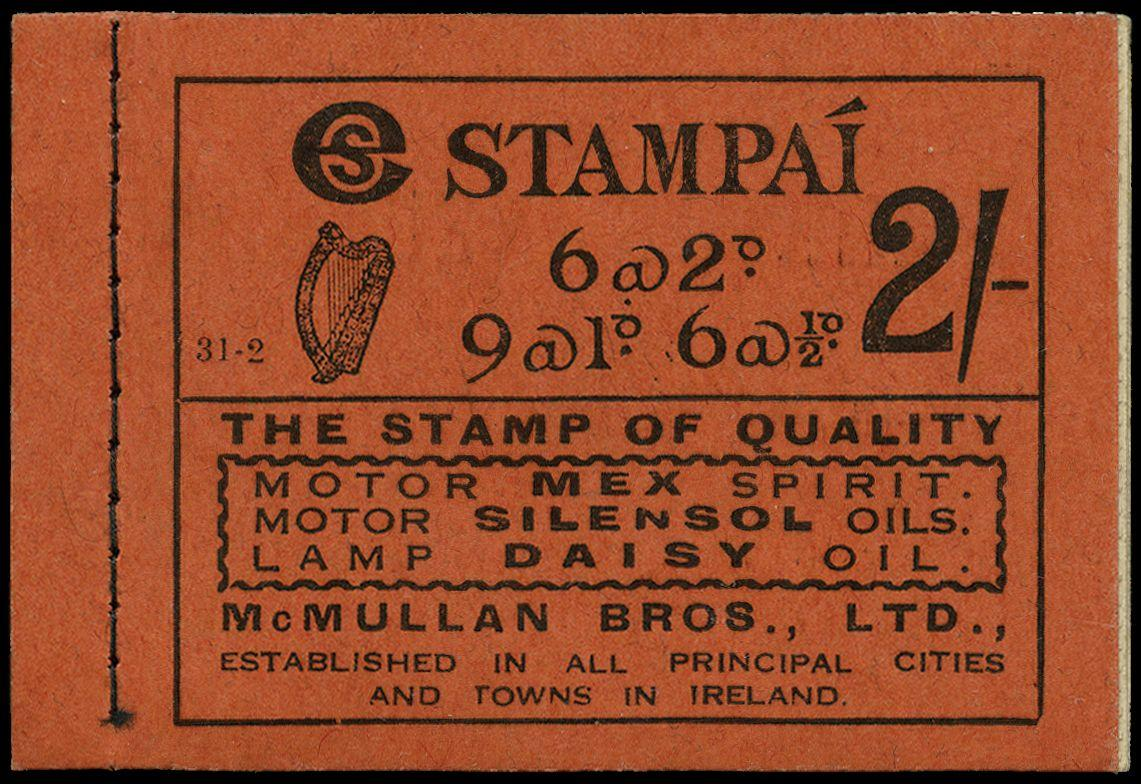
A 1931 stamp booklet contained 2/- worth of stamps showing the serial number and year of issue 31-2 with advertising on half of front.

Stamp booklets were first put on sale on 21 August 1931. Booklet construction was a lightweight cardboard cover stitched on the left-hand side with panes of stamps (usually four panes), advertising panes and interleaving bound in. Until 1956 most booklets had half of the front cover devoted to advertising, and until 1963 booklets also had serial numbers on the front cover: two numbers indicated the year of issue and serial number (in that order on the early issues but with the order reversed for later issues), until 1963 when the serial numbers ceased. Since 1983, most booklets are no longer stitched; the stamp pane, or panes, are glued into a folded card cover.

Until 1988, when the Dublin Millennium booklet containing commemorative stamps was issued, all booklets contained only definitive stamps. Since then, An Post has issued both commemorative and definitive booklets, with three times as many commemorative booklets issued. In 1990 An Post issued the first booklet mixing definitive and commemorative stamps in one booklet and also on a single pane.

Many booklet stamps can be identified by one non-perforated edge, though a few are perforated on all edges. On booklets up to 1977, the printing plate construction enabled both upright and inverted watermarks in equal quantities owing to a gutter dividing rows 6 and 7 in the sheets of 12 × 10 stamps. The gutter was used for stitching during assembly, requiring rows 4–6 and 10–12 to be turned through 180 degrees so those panes could be stitched on the left of the booklet.

=== Watermarks ===
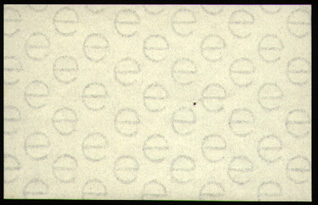
From 1940, 'e' watermark paper was used.

The Irish overprinted stamps came, as supplied from the printers in London, with a watermark of the Royal Cypher of George V. The first Irish watermark was a stylised design of the two overlapping letters 's' and 'e' making an 'se' watermark representing the name of the country Saorstát Éireann. This watermark was discontinued around 1940 when the country's name changed to Éire (Ireland); it was replaced with e watermark paper to represent Éire. Stamps of the period may have the watermark in any of several states of inversion and rotation attributable to the way the paper was fed into the printing machines. Around 1971, the use of watermarks was discontinued by the Irish stamp-issuing authority, with the 4th definitive series and the stamps commemorating the 50th death anniversary of Kevin Barry in 1970 except for the Gerard Dillon contemporary art stamp in 1972.

== Postal stationery ==
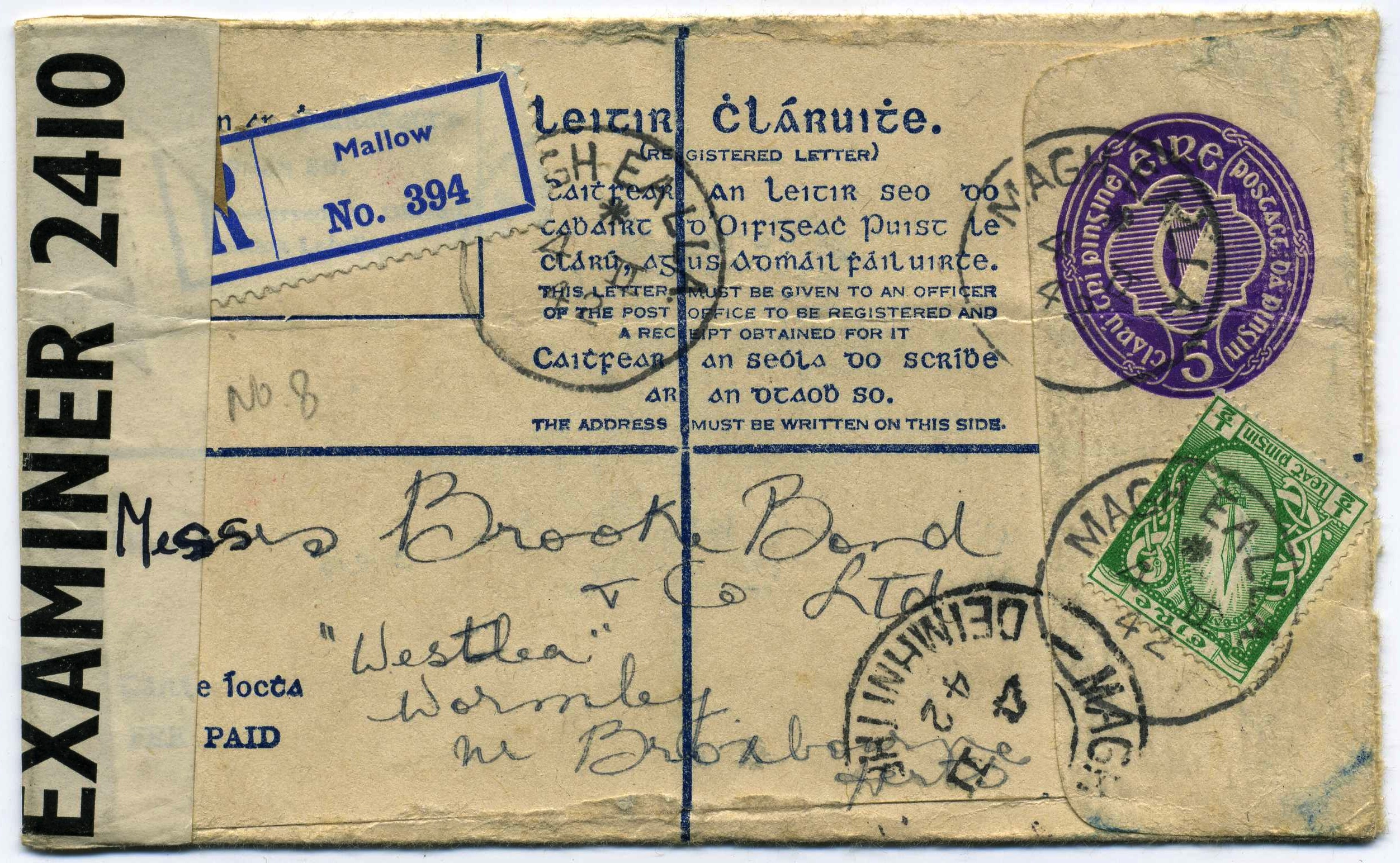
Uprated postal stationery registered envelope censored by British authorities in 1942

Postal stationery have been produced in the form of registered envelopes, postal cards, envelopes, letter cards, newspaper wrappers, airletters and telegram forms with different designs of impressed stamp applied to show that postage had been pre-paid. Except for limited early usage of previously issued British postal stationery, which were not overprinted like the postage stamps, all post-paid impressed stamps before 1984 were based on variations of a design showing the country's name in Irish, Éire, with appropriate values in text and numeral tablets centred around an Irish harp motif. This was initially superseded by a shamrock design that later became loosely based on the logo of wavy lines and the word POST used by An Post from 1984. An Post has also used some designs based on postage stamps as post-paid impressed stamps on Irish postal stationery.

A few early issued items were embossed but generally the post-paid impressed stamps were typographed. The Revenue Stamping Branch, Dublin Castle, applied the impressed indicia until 1984, when An Post employed the lithographic printing method.

=== Official ===
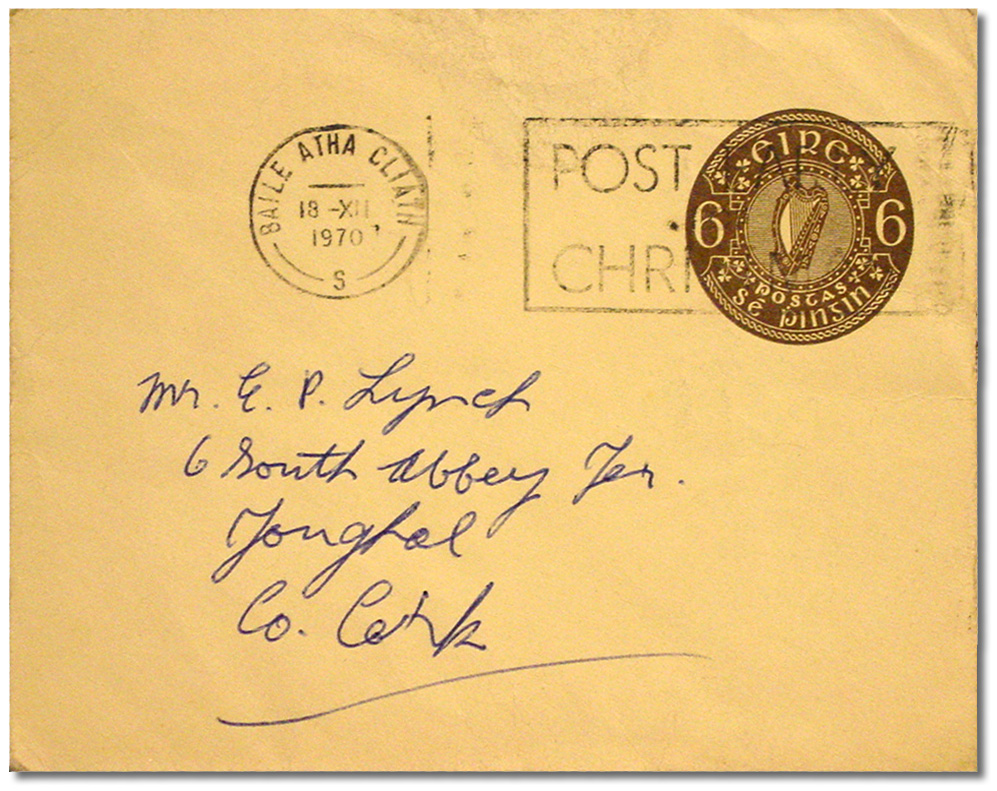
Postal stationery envelope with a 6d post-paid impression paying the domestic printed matter rate in 1970 from Dublin to Youghal, County Cork

At independence, a King George V 5-pence registered envelope and 1-shilling telegram form were printed in green for use in Ireland until domestic products became available. Irish telegram forms were only produced in 1/- and 1/6 values. Registered envelopes have appeared in many values and sizes. The printed (but non-stamped) registered envelopes were produced by private firms and stored by the Irish post office until needed, so envelopes from former periods, showing outdated fees in the text, often received an impressed stamp for the current postal rate, creating many subtypes for collectors. Other products have carried post-paid imprint, such as commemorative and special issue postcards, including a series of Saint Patrick's Day cards issued annually since 1984.

Up to 1987, airletters (also known as aerogrammes) were produced without any fee applied and were available free from post offices upon payment of the appropriate rate in force for the postage stamp purchased to mail the airletter. Most airletters with a pre-paid indicia have been sold at a small premium over the then-current aerogramme postal rate.

=== Stamped-to-order ===
Known as the stamping privilege, companies, associations and individuals were permitted to submit their own designed and pre-printed envelopes, cards, letter sheets, etc., to the Irish Post Office for impressing with an official post-paid indicia. Window envelopes were popular for printed matter rate mail. The most prolific user was the Electricity Supply Board which used meter reading and appointment cards for over forty years.

Stamped-to-order postal stationery users included Blackrock College, Córas Iompair Éireann, Esso, Great Northern Railway, and John Player & Sons, Dublin. No stamped-to-order registered envelopes are recorded by Jung. Apparently An Post have withdrawn the stamping privilege without any public notice, because stamped-to-order postal stationery has seldom been seen since An Post took control of the Irish Post Office in 1984, with only five users recorded by Jung. Between 1963 and 2000 a few philatelically influenced items are known produced by only six users.

== Collecting Irish stamps ==
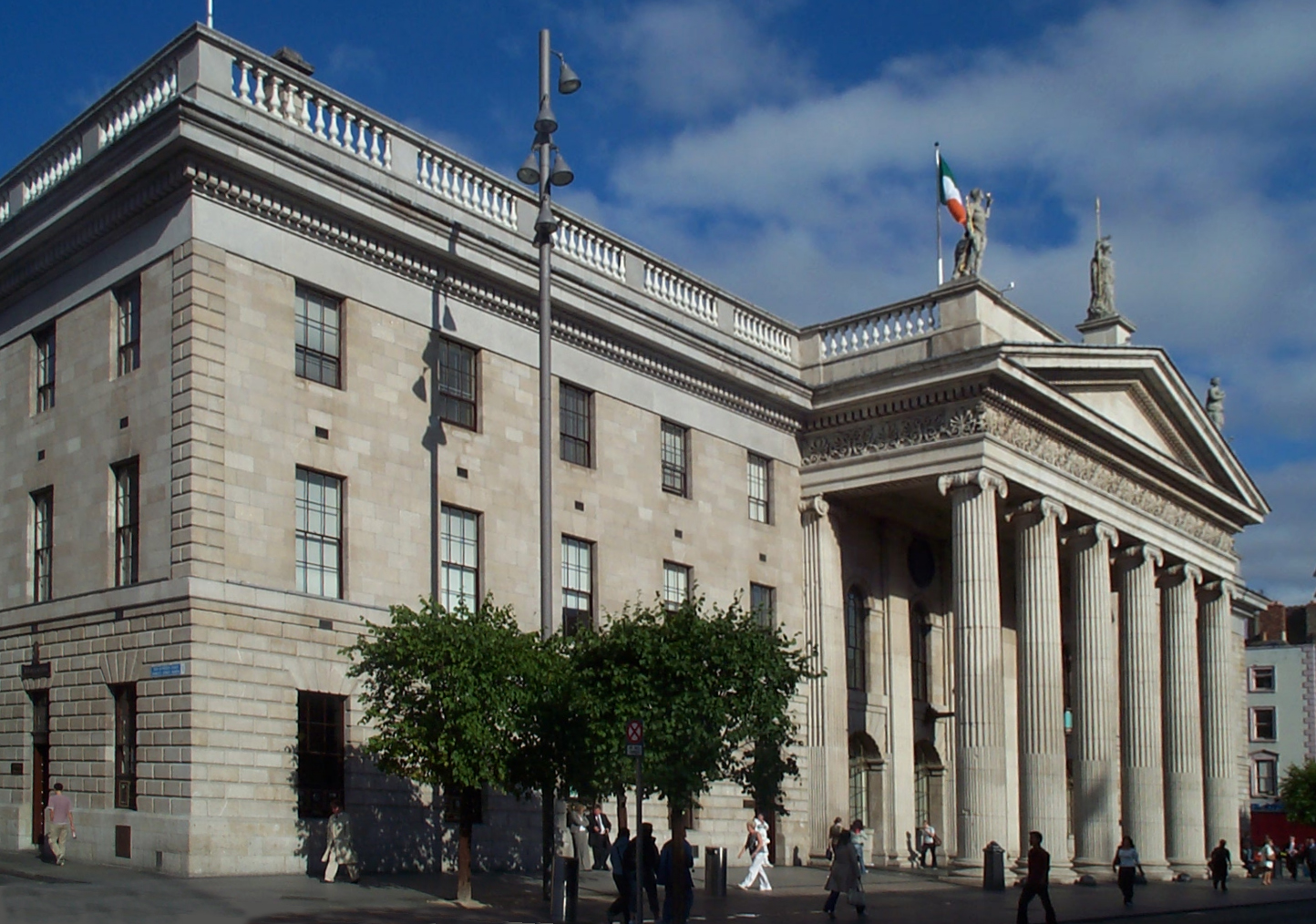
An Post's Philatelic Bureau is in the General Post Office in Dublin

Newly issued Irish postage stamps are available from the Philatelic Bureau of An Post in the General Post Office (GPO) in central Dublin. Commemorative and special issue stamps are usually available for one year from the date of issue. Until the mid-1960s the Irish stamp-issuing policy was very conservative, with only a few new ones each year; up to four or five commemoratives, usually of two values, plus the occasional updated, or new, definitives. During the late 1960s and beyond, the issue quantity produced rose considerably as many as eighteen in 2018. There are two specialised publications that quote quantities printed that were available from the issuing authority. Five issues had low printing numbers from 850,320 to 940,140 and the 1961 St. Patrick 8d value only lists 500,160 copies. Many collectors concentrate on one type of stamp, such as definitives or commemoratives, or even one issue, such as Gerl definitives, confirmed by three definitive issue specialty publications. The First Day covers, especially commemoratives with full sets affixed, are popular though the older issues are harder to find because less than a million of the high value stamps were printed in the early years (1929–1940s) for several issues, a far lower number than the 20-plus millions printed for most of the low values during the same period.

The overprints, which proved very popular during their early years, are a complex topic giving an advanced collector a great philatelic challenge.

=== Numbering systems ===
The Irish Post Office has never publicised an official stamp numbering system for the postage stamps they issued, so collectors use a stamp numbering system from one of the most popular stamp catalogues, such as Stanley Gibbons, Scott, MacDonnell Whyte, MDW (last edition 1991), Hibernian or Michel. There are differences between these numbering systems that result in a varying sequence of stamps in each listing, with some stamps included on some lists but not on others—usually varieties that the publishers think do not belong in a general catalogue. For instance, Ireland's first postage stamp, the 2d Map of Ireland, issued in 1922 is numbered 68 by Scott, 43 by Michel, D4 by Hibernian and MacDonnell Whyte and 74 by Stanley Gibbons.

Collectors tend to use the catalogues produced in their own region and language, so in the United States, Scott is used most often as evidenced by the use of Scott numbers in American stamp auction catalogues. In contrast, SG numbers are used in England and Ireland because Stanley Gibbons (a British publisher) produces the catalogue of choice in those countries. Advanced and more specialist collectors have used the David Feldman, later called MacDonnell/Feldman, and later again called MacDonnellWhyte, catalogues between 1978 and 1991, and Hibernian catalogues (1972, 1976, 1980, 1983, 1985, 1986, 2002, 2009 and 2020 editions).

=== Stamp societies ===
==== Local societies ====
- DSS, Dublin Stamp Society, founded in 1948.
- IPS, Irish Philatelic Society, is more than a century old, having started as the Irish Philatelic Club following a meeting in Dublin on 12 February 1901, of nineteen people who responded to a notice in the Irish Times.

==== International societies ====
- ÉPA, Éire Philatelic Association, is a US-based Irish philatelic society.
- IPC, Irish Philatelic Circle, is a British-based Irish philatelic society.
- FAI, Forschungs- und Arbeitsgemeinschaft Irland e.V., is a German-based Irish philatelic society.

== See also ==
- Joint issues
- King George V Seahorses
- Richard King (artist)
- List of people on the postage stamps of Ireland
- Revenue stamps of Ireland
- Timeline of postal history

== References and sources ==
Notes

Sources

- Buchalter, M. Don (1972). Buchalter, M. Don (ed.). Hibernian Specialised Catalogue of the Postage Stamps of Ireland 1922–1972. Hibernian Stamp Co Ltd, Dublin, Ireland.
- Dulin, Cyril I. (1992). Ireland's Transition: The Postal History of the Transitional Period 1922–1925. MacDonnell Whyte Ltd, Dublin, Ireland. ISBN 978-0-9517095-1-1
- Feldman, David (1968). Handbook of Irish Philately. Dublin, Ireland: David Feldman Ltd & the Dolman Press Ltd.
- Foley, Joe (April 1978). "The Postage Stamps of Ireland 1922–1927 by W.G. Meredith—revised". The Revealer. XXVII No. 4 (130): 61. ISSN 0484-6125.
- Freeman, F. F.; Stubbs, T. T. (April 1922). Provisional Issue: Irish Free State Stamps (1st ed.). Dublin, Ireland: Mint Stamp Company.
- Gibbons, Edward Stanley (2004). Stanley Gibbons Stamp Catalogue Ireland (2nd ed.). London & Ringwood: Stanley Gibbons. pp. 30–31. ISBN 978-0-85259-583-1.
- Hamilton-Bowen, Roy; Wolverton, Lee R., eds. (2019). Hibernian Handbook and Specialised Catalogue of the Postage Stamps of Ireland 1922-1919. Ridgau, Germany: Rodgau Philatelie. ISBN 978-3-9807973-3-7.
- Jung, Otto (2003). Irish Postal Stationery Stamped to Order. Germany: FAI, Forschungs- und Arbeitsgemeinschaft Irland e. V.
- Jung, Otto; Clancy, Barney (2002). Postal Stationery of Ireland (3rd ed.). Germany: FAI, Forschungs- und Arbeitsgemeinschaft Irland e. V.
- Jung, Otto (1992). The Irish Architecture Definitives. FAI, Forschungs- und Arbeitsgemeinschaft Irland e. V.
- MacDonnell, David; Whyte, Ian, eds. (1990). MacDonnell Whyte Stamps of Ireland: Specialised Handbook, 1991 Edition (13th ed.). Dublin, Ireland: Ian Whyte (Ireland) & MacDonnell Whyte. ISBN 978-0-9517095-0-4.
- Miller, Liam (1983). Kane, William (ed.). Postage Stamps of Ireland 1922–1982. Dublin, Ireland: Philatelic Section, Department of Posts and Telegraphs. ISBN 978-0-946521-01-2.
- Meredith, W. G. (1927). The Postage Stamps of Ireland 1922–1927 (4th ed.). London: W. Meredith.
- Reynolds, Mairead (1983). A History of The Irish Post Office. MacDonnell Whyte Ltd, Dublin, Ireland. ISBN 978-0-9502619-7-3.
- Warren, Brian; Fitzgerald, Edward (1978). The Gerl Definitives. Ian Whyte. ISBN 978-0-9506415-0-8.
- Warren, Brian; Jung, Otto (2000). Irish Heritage and Treasures. FAI, Forschungs- und Arbeitsgemeinschaft Irland e. V.

Related reading

- Mackay, James A. (1982). Irish Postmarks Since 1840. Dumfries, Scotland: James A. Mackey.
- Munk, Herbert (1941). Kohl's Briefmarken Handbuch und grosser katalog: Irish Free State (section) (English translation by H.G. Zervas ed.). Berlin: Collectors Club of New York.
- Summers, Howard (2020). Bibliography of the Philately and Postal History of the British Isles. Howcom Services, Borehamwood, UK. ISBN 978-1-7025-2236-6.
