= Certified email =

Email with proof of receipt

Certified email (known as Posta elettronica certificata in Italy, or PEC in short) is a special type of email in use in Italy, Switzerland, Hong Kong and Germany. Certified email is meant to provide a legal equivalent of the traditional registered mail, where users are able to legally prove that a given email has been sent and received by paying a small fee.

Registered mail is mainly used in Italy, but there are present efforts to extend its legal validity according to the framework of the European Union.

== Description ==
A certified email can only be sent using a special Certified Email Account provided by a registered provider. When a certified email is sent, the sender's provider will release a receipt of the successful (or failed) transaction. This receipt has legal value and it includes precise information about the time the certified email was sent. Similarly, the receiver's provider will deliver the message in the appropriate certified email account and will then release to the sender a receipt of successful (or failed) delivery, indicating on this receipt the exact time of delivery. If either of these two receipts are lost by the sender, providers are required to issue a proof of transaction with equal legal validity, if this proof is requested within 30 months of delivery.

In terms of user experience, a certified email account is very similar to a normal email account. The only additional features are the receipts, received as attachments, providing details and timestamps for all transactions. A certified email account can only handle certified email and cannot be used to send regular email.

== Technical process ==
The development of this email service has conceptual variations that are dominated by two-party scenarios with only one sender and one receiver as well as a trusted third party (TTP) serving as a mediator. As in traditional registered mail, many certified email technologies call for the parties involved to trust the TTP, or the "postman", because it has the capacity to reveal the identity of the sender to the recipient once the protocol is initiated. There are, however, some applications based on multi-party email protocols; these include the technology originally proposed by Markowitch and Kremer, that involves an online or offline TTP in addition to the sender and receiver. There is also a multi-party version, wherein a user can send the same email to multiple recipients. In this system, those who acknowledge the receipt are able to view the data. Some applications also offer add-in features, such as the integration of the concept of timeliness, wherein a participant to the process can terminate a session in finite time in order to avoid waiting for a reply forever.

The mediation of a trusted third party (TTP) requires both parties, the sender and the recipient, to come to terms in approving who will be the mediator. In compliance scenarios, where a regulation may simply require a party to deliver a notice to a given recipient and be able to prove having done so (i.e. GDPR), the role of a TTP can be trusted to an electronic registered delivery service capable to secure timestamped evidence of the contents and delivery of the electronic message, without the recipient's intervention.

== Certified email in Italy ==
The Italian certified email (Posta elettronica certificata, PEC) was established in 2005 and it uses protocols described in the RFC 6109 (Request for Comments 6109), which was drafted in order to make the protocols public to the Internet community.

Since July 1 of 2013, all communications between enterprises and the Italian public administration are required to be sent through PEC and paper documents are no longer accepted.

All matters concerning PEC in Italy are supervised and regulated by a special government agency called AgID ("Agenzia per l'Italia digitale") which determines the authorized certified email providers, the legal framework of PEC and the rules and terms of use.

Anyone may register a PEC address through a certified provider or reseller.

Starting from 2022, Italy is migrating from PEC to an EIDAS-compliant protocol, called Registered Electronic Mail. The switch over to the new protocol is being led by Roberto Reale and Alessandra Antolini on behalf of AgID.

Comparison of direct Certified E-Mail providers in Italy
PEC provider	eidas compatible 2024?	DMA friendly (Google or Apple independent)	Limitation	address portability
Intesi Group	will be in 2024	?	Unknown	No
Aruba (Actalis)	Yes	No		No
Infocert	Yes	No		No
Università degli Studi di Napoli Federico II	⋯	?	Only for students and other business partners	No
TWT	No	?	⋯	No
Sogei	—N/a	?	Only for business partners	No
register.it	No	?	⋯	No
Regione Marche - Posta Raffaello	—N/a	?	suppressed	No
Poste Italiane	—N/a	?	⋯	No
Consiglio Nazionale del Notariato	No	?	private	No
Namirial	?	Yes (login via spid. if spid provider is DMA friendly SMS OTP is possible)	—N/a	No
Cedacri Cert	⋯	?	⋯	No
IN.TE.SA. S.p.A.	offline	?	offline	No
Irideos S.p.A. (kolst)	No	?		No
Notartel S.p.A.		?		No
Sogei	No	?	—N/a	No

Other PEC provider can be indirect (using the AGID direct provider as service provider) like virgilio.pec.it, spidmail.it, sicurezzapostale.it, ingpec.eu, ...

== Certified email in EU ==
PEC in other European Union countries is called REM (registered email) and has different provider here listed in the table.

Comparison of Certified E-Mail providers in Europe
Nation	PEC provider	DMA friendly (Google or Apple independent)	Limitation	address portability	Active Qualified Trust Services	Active but NOT qualified Trust Services
Belgium	Connect Solutions	Unknown	only B2B	Unknown	QeRDS	
Belgium	SA UNIFIEDPOST	Unknown	only B2B	Unknown	QeRDS	
Belgium	IPEX	Unknown	only B2B	Unknown	QeRDS	
Belgium	Dioss Smart Solutions	Yes (SMS\e-mail OTP)	only B2B	Unknown	QeRDS	
Belgium	Postalia Belgium	Unknown	only B2B	Unknown	QeRDS	
Bulgaria	BORICA AD	Unknown	only B2B	Unknown	QCert for ESig QCert for ESeal QWAC QVal for QESig QPres for QESig QVal for QESeal QPres for QESeal QTimestamp QeRDS	Non-Regulatory
Bulgaria	Evrotrust Technologies JSC	Unknown	only B2B	Unknown	QCert for ESig QCert for ESeal QWAC QVal for QESig QPres for QESig QVal for QESeal QPres for QESeal QTimestamp QeRDS	Non-Regulatory
Germany	bitkasten GmbH	Unknown	Unknown	Unknown	QeRDS	
Spain	EDICOM CAPITAL, S.L.	Unknown	Unknown	Unknown	QCert for ESig QCert for ESeal QVal for QESig QVal for QESeal QPres for QESeal QTimestamp QeRDS	
Spain	SISTEMAS INFORMATICOS ABIERTOS S.A.U.	Unknown	Unknown	Unknown	QCert for ESigQCert for ESealQTimestampQeRDS	
Spain	IVNOSYS SOLUCIONES S.L.U.				QCert for ESigQCert for ESealQTimestampQeRDS	
Spain	Logalty Prueba por Interposición, S.L.				QCert for ESealQTimestampQeRDS	
Spain	LLEIDANETWORKS SERVEIS TELEMATICS, S.A.	Yes (SMS)			QeRDS	
Spain	DIGITEL ON TRUSTED SERVICES S.L.U.				QCert for ESigQCert for ESealQTimestampQeRDS	
Spain	MAILTECK, S.A.				QeRDS	
Spain	CUSTOMER COMMUNICATIONS TECKNALIA, S.L.				QeRDS	
Spain	WISE SECURITY GLOBAL S.L.				QeRDS	
Spain	SERVICIOS DE MAILCERTIFICADO SL				QeRDS	
Spain	FACTORYNET AUGUSTA, S.L.				QeRDS	
Spain	FULL CERTIFICATE S.L.				QeRDS	
Spain	ANF Certification Authority, S.L.				QCert for ESigQCert for ESealQWACQVal for QESigQPres for QESigQVal for QESealQPres for QESealQTimestampQeRDS	
Spain	CGI INFORMATION SYSTEMS AND MANAGEMENT CONSULTANTS ESPAÑA SA		Only B2B		QeRDS	
Spain	FACTUM IDENTITY SOLUTIONS, S.L.U.				QeRDS	
Spain	ANF AUTORIDAD DE CERTIFICACIÓN ASOCIACIÓN ANF AC				QCert for ESigQCert for ESealQWACQVal for QESigQPres for QESigQVal for QESealQPres for QESealQTimestampQeRDS	
France	STAMPEE				QeRDS	
France	AR24		Only B2B		QeRDS	
France	DARVA				QTimestampQeRDS	
France	Equisign				QeRDS	
France	TESSI DOCUMENTS SERVICES		Only B2B		QeRDS	
France	CLEARBUS				QTimestamp QeRDS	
France	DOCUMENT CHANNEL				QeRDS	
France	DATASURE				QCert for ESigQCert for ESealQTimestampQeRDS	
Croatia	HP d.d.				QeRDS	
Italy	inPoste.it S.p.A.	No (proprietary authentication app only on Gatekeepers appstore)			QeRDS	
Italy	PagoPA Spa	No (proprietary authentication app only on Gatekeepers appstore)			QeRDS	
Italy	Postel S.p.A.	No (proprietary authentication app only on Gatekeepers appstore)			QeRDS	
Italy	InfoCert S.p.A.	No (proprietary authentication app only on Gatekeepers appstore)			QCert for ESigQCert for ESealQWACQVal for QESigQVal for QESealQTimestampQeRDS	Timestamp Non-Regulatory
Italy	Aruba Posta Elettronica Certificata S.p.A.	No (proprietary authentication app only on Gatekeepers appstore)		No	QCert for ESigQCert for ESealQWACQTimestampQeRDS	Timestamp Non-Regulatory
Luxembourg	LuxTrust S.A.	No (proprietary authentication app only on Gatekeepers appstore)			QCert for ESigQCert for ESealQVal for QESigQVal for QESealQTimestampQeRDS	
Netherlands	Aangetekend B.V.	Yes			QeRDS	
Netherlands	Secumail B.V.	Yes (SMS, IDIN, itsme, BankID, UAEPass)	Only B2B	No	QeRDS / QREMS	
Poland	Polish Security Printing Works		Only B2B		QCert for ESigQCert for ESealQTimestampQeRDS	Timestamp
Poland	Asseco Data Systems S.A.	No			QCert for ESigQCert for ESealQVal for QESigQPres for QESigQVal for QESealQPres for QESealQTimestampQeRDS	Non-Regulatory
Poland	KFJ Inwestycje Sp. z o.o.				QeRDS	
Poland	Poczta Polska S. A.		only for Polish citizens		QeRDS	
Poland	Autenti Sp. z o.o.	Yes (SMS)	only B2B		QeRDS	
Slovenia	EIUS d.o.o.				QVal for QESigQVal for QESealQTimestampQeRDS	

== See also ==
- Registered mail
- Email authentication
- Secure messaging
- eIDAS
- De-Mail
