= Harrison Collection =

The Harrison Collection is a collection of mostly British and British Commonwealth die proofs engraved by J.A.C. Harrison between 1911 and 1937. The collection forms part of the British Library Philatelic Collections and was donated by H.W.P. Harrison in 1963.
