= Richard King (artist) =

Irish stained glass artist and illustrator

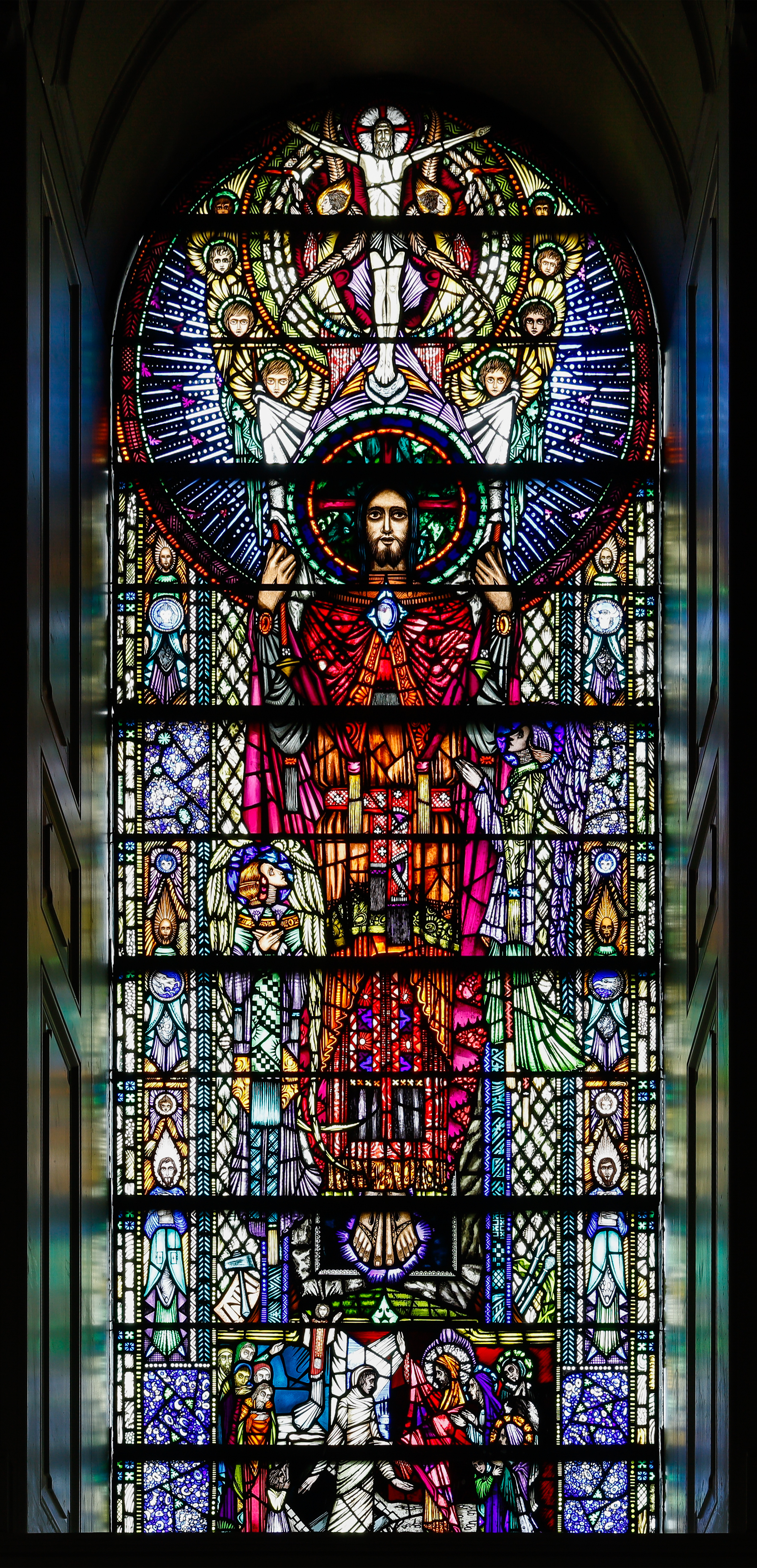
Resurrection window by Richard King in St Mel's Cathedral, 1932, restored after the fire in 2009.

Richard Joseph King (Rísteard Ó Cíonga; 7 July 1907 – 17 March 1974) was an Irish stained glass artist and illustrator. He was born in Castlebar, County Mayo, Ireland, where his father was a sergeant in the Royal Irish Constabulary. In 1926 he became a student at the Dublin Metropolitan School of Art and he entered the stained glass studio of Harry Clarke in 1928. Clarke died in early 1931, of tuberculosis while trying to recuperate in Switzerland. King completed the ongoing work on the windows of St. Mel's Cathedral in Longford, and managed the studio from 1935 to 1940. He then worked independently from his own studio in Dalkey. Among his works are the stained glass windows of St. Jude's Shrine, Faversham, St. Anthony's church Athlone, five full size windows in St. Peter and Paul's church in Athlone and three windows in the James Jeffrey Roche Room in Boston College's Bapst Library.

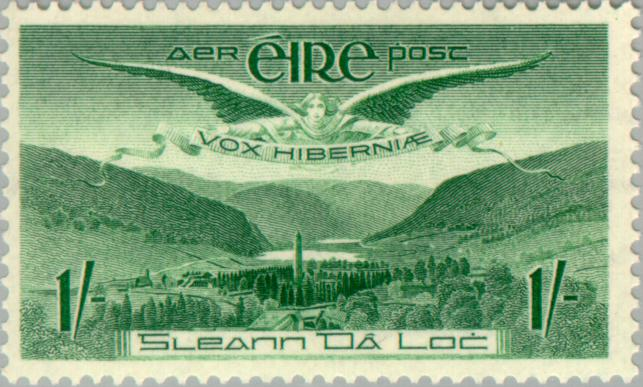
Irish airmail stamp designed by King - Vox Hiberniæ flying over Glendalough

Many of his illustrations are to be found in the Capuchin Annual from 1940 onwards.

Between 1933 and 1949 he designed twelve Irish postage stamps. They are: Holy Year, 1933; Constitution, 1937; St. Patrick, 1937; Davitt and Parnell, 1946; four airmail stamps, 1948/1949; G.A.A., 1934; Four Masters, 1944; Thomas Davis, 1945; James Clarence Mangan, 1949.

He died at his home in Raheny on St Patrick's Day, 1974.
