= Forschungs- und Arbeitsgemeinschaft Irland e.V. =

German society for Irish philately

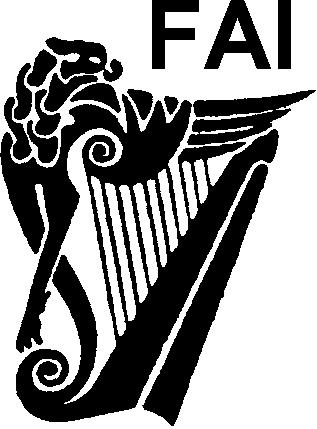
Emblem of the Forschungs- und Arbeitsgemeinschaft Irland e.V.

The Forschungs- und Arbeitsgemeinschaft Irland (FAI – Research and Study Group on Irish Philately) is a registered society, a member of the Bund Deutscher Philatelisten (Association of German Philatelists), and is engaged in Irish philately. The FAI was founded on 24 July 1982 by Frank Holzmüller in order to establish a platform for research and communication for all those interested in Irish philately in the German Federal Republic. Since then the society has become international. The more than 200 members (by 2013) come from four continents and the majority not from Germany. Heinz-Jürgen Kumpf has been President of the FAI since May 2007.

The FAI keeps in touch with the other philatelic Ireland societies all over the world and cooperates with the Irish postal administration An Post. The members meet regularly at regional meetings and the Annual General Meeting, which take place in all parts of Germany.

The society publishes the members’ magazine Die Harfe (The Harp) three times per year. All aspects of Irish philately are treated in more than 200 pages annually. The first 30 volumes are also available digitally, on DVD or USB flash drive. In particular, the magazine deals with Irish postal history. It encompasses, among others, old postal routes, the transport of mail on board overseas steamboats, national and international postal fees, and the Maltese Cross postmarks used in Ireland. Documentation of the postal history of the Irish independence movement is also an important field. Furthermore, the FAI researches the use of postmark machines, military postal history, postal censorship and post from prisoners of war, Irish postal stationery, international reply coupons, and revenue stamps.

The FAI publishes philatelic literature; as of 2014 a series of 30 volumes have been released. By publishing this series, the FAI contributes to the progress of philatelic research in the field of Irish postal history. In the year of publication, all FAI members receive a copy of the new volume either for free or at a special rate, depending on the number of pages and retail price.

FAI members can consult FAI experts on many different fields of Irish philately.

Since the mid-1990s, all publications (the members’ magazine as well as the novelties in the publication series) are edited completely bilingual in German and English. The publications of the FAI thus constitute an important link between the German- and the English-speaking philatelists and are accessible for collectors and researchers in the field of Irish philately all over the world with no language barrier.

== See also ==
- Postage stamps of Ireland
