= Namirial =

Italy-based multinational IT company

- Industry: IT
- Founded: 2000
- Headquarters: Senigallia, Italy
- Key people: Massimiliano Pellegrini (CEO)
- Revenue: 270 M € (2025)
- Owner: Bain Capital
- Number of employees: 1400 (2025)
- Website: https://www.namirial.com/

Namirial is an Italy-based multinational IT company operating in the digital transaction management (DTM) sector. The company develops software and technologies related to digital identity verification, electronic invoicing, and secure digital workflows.

== History ==
The company was founded in 2000 in Senigallia (a town in the province of Ancona), where its headquarters are located, and today has numerous branch offices in Italy, Germany, France, Spain, Austria, Romania, Latin America, and Asia (Singapore and Macau).

The company began providing customised software for the digital transformation of small and medium-sized enterprises (SMEs) and various professional sectors. Subsequently, the company entered the market for qualified trust services, providing certified email and starting a process that in 2007 led it to obtain the qualification of certified electronic mail manager and registration in the special public list kept by AgID, the Italian public agency for digital innovation.

Starting in 2010, the company proposed its own qualified electronic signature service, for which in the same year it was certified as a Qualified Trust Services Provider (QTSP) under European Regulation 910/2014 on electronic identification and trust services (eIDAS) and listed in the public registry of active trust service providers in Italy, maintained by AgID Agenzia per l'Italia Digitale.

In 2014, Namirial started an electronic storage service, based on the guidelines issued by AgID. Subsequently, the company obtained enrollment in the marketplace of enrolled conservators, a special list maintained by AgID and reserved for public and private entities that intend to provide the service of preservation of computerized documents on behalf of public administrations.

The development of services related to digital identity started in 2017 with Namirial's entry into SPID (the Italian digital identity public system) as an AgID-accredited provider for the issuance of digital identity.

== Contribution to the development of the EUDI Wallet ==
In 2022, Namirial joined Potential - Pilots for European Digital Identity Wallet Consortium, one of four pan-European consortia and large scale pilots committed to developing and testing the use of the EUDI Wallet (European Digital Identity Wallet) as envisioned by the European Commission, in a wide range of use cases, before their roll-out to Member States. Since 2025, Namirial has also been part of the Aptitude consortium, a European alliance of public institutions, experts, and innovators working together and coordinated by France’s National Agency for Secure Documents (ANTS), that involves over 110 organizations from more than 15 countries and focuses on testing the digital wallet in the mobility, transportation, and banking sectors.

== The Ambienta and Bain Capital funds and the merger with the Signaturit Group ==
In 2020, Ambienta SGR SpA, a private equity fund focused on sustainability, entered the share capital of Namirial with a 70 percent stake.

In March 2025, global private equity firm Bain Capital agreed to acquire a majority stake in Namirial SpA from Italian investment firm Ambienta, valuing the company at approximately €1.1 billion, according to people familiar with the matter. Several international buyout firms had expressed interest in acquiring Namirial prior to the transaction.

In July of that same year, Bain Capital announced the start of exclusive talks with the PSG fund regarding the merger between Namirial and Signaturit, a Spain-based company that also operates in France and provides cloud-based Digital Transaction Management (DTM) services in Southern Europe.
