= Registered envelope =

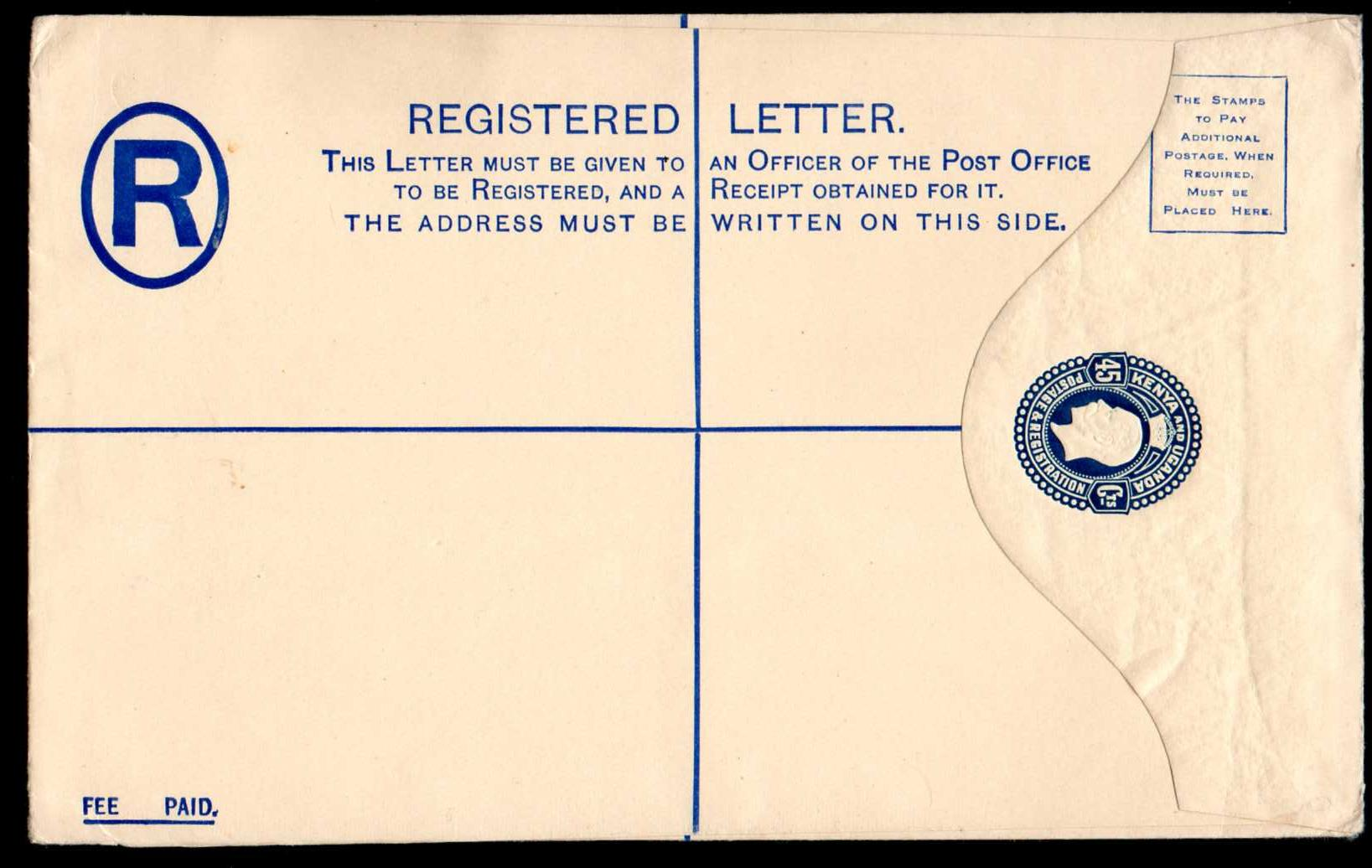
A registered envelope for Kenya and Uganda from 1930.

A registered envelope is a form of postal stationery consisting of a strong envelope with an imprinted stamp or indicia used for sending registered mail. The envelopes usually include a perpendicular blue cross and an R in a circle symbol, both internationally recognised symbols of registered mail. The imprinted stamp (often on the flap) shows the fee for the registration service, while a space is left for a postage stamp to be affixed to pay the postage fee. The envelopes are usually marked Registered Letter but that term strictly only relates to a normal letter or packet that has extra postage and markings applied so that it may travel under the registered mail service.

Sizes are known with these dimensions though some variations do occur. H and K sizes are less common.

- F – 134 mm x 83 mm
- G – 153 mm x 96 mm
- H – 202 mm x 127 mm
- K – 293 mm x 151 mm

Registered envelopes have been widely used throughout Great Britain and the British Commonwealth, but none have been issued in the United States, where registration procedures are different.

Registered envelopes are one of the main types of postal stationery collected by philatelists.
