= King George V Seahorses =

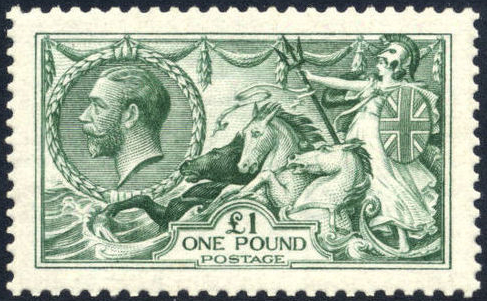
A 1913 £1 "Seahorse" stamp.

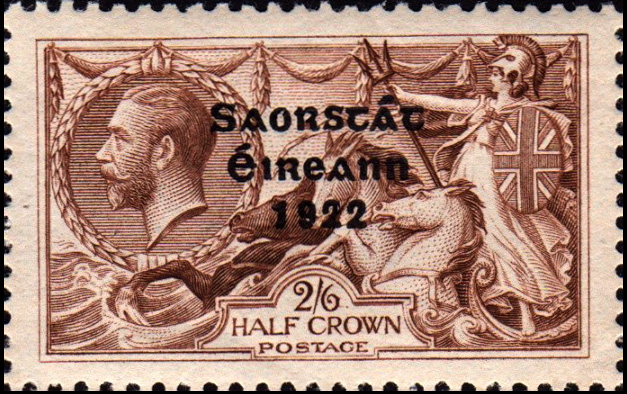
A Bradbury Wilkinson 2/6 'Seahorse' with Irish Free State overprint.

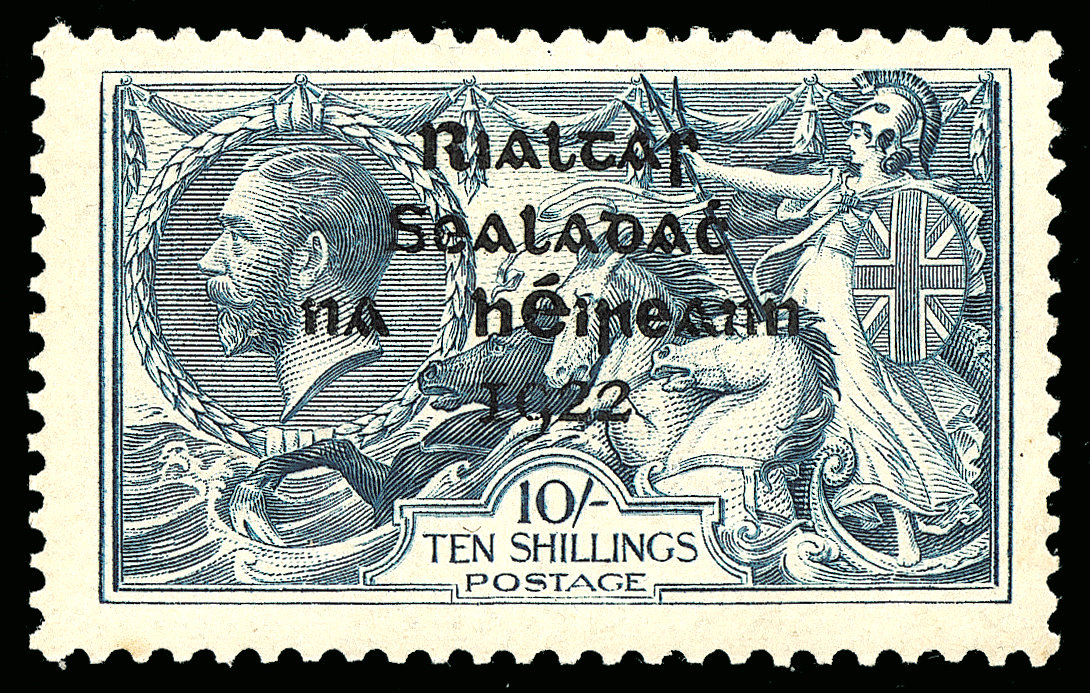
A 10/- 'Seahorse' with 1922 Provisional Government of Ireland overprint.

'Seahorses' is the name used to refer to the United Kingdom high value definitive postage stamps issued during the reign of King George V.

The stamps are notable for the quality of the engraving and the dramatic design which depicts Britannia on her chariot behind three writhing horses on a stormy sea. The stamps represent a collecting field in their own right for some philatelists due to the colour variations and different printers.

George V was a keen philatelist and took an interest in the design of the stamps by the Australian sculptor Bertram Mackennal, who included the King's head in profile, a design that he had first used for the Coronation medal. The lettering was designed by George W. Eve, with the dies engraved by J.A.C.Harrison and the stamps were intaglio (recess) printed. The stamps first issued in July/August 1913 in 2/6 (brown), 5/- (red), 10/- (blue) and £1 (green) values. The first printer was Waterlow Bros & Layton, then in December 1915 the contract was awarded to De La Rue & Co, the height of the stamps was increased by 1mm and the £1 value was dropped.

In December 1918 Bradbury, Wilkinson & Co. Ltd took over the printing of the stamps. The contract returned to Waterlow & Sons in 1934 and the dies were re-engraved, with the horizontal engraved lines behind the King's head on the earlier issues replaced with cross-hatched lines.

Overprints included Morocco Agencies and Irish Free State. The stamps were replaced in 1939 by the King George VI high value series.
