= Evrotrust =

- Type: Private
- Industry: Digital Identity, Electronic Signature, Trust services Identity Verification; Fintech
- Founded: 2018
- Headquarters: Sofia, Bulgaria
- Key people: Konstantin Bezuhanov (CEO); George Dimitrov (Chairman of the Board of Directors)
- Products: Evrotrust eID Qualified electronic signatures Electronic timestamps Electronic registered delivery
- Website: evrotrust.com

Evrotrust is a digital identity and qualified trust services provider based in Sofia, Bulgaria. The company offers solutions for electronic signatures, electronic identification, timestamping, electronic delivery, and other trust services compliant with the European Union’s eIDAS regulation. The company’s eIDAS notified eID scheme was designated as Bulgaria’s official digital identity program by the Council of the Ministers of Bulgaria in 2023. Evrotrust has also been involved in initiatives related to the European Digital Identity Wallet, including WE BUILD Consortium, a large-scale pilots testing the European Digital Identity Wallet and work on wallet-ready credentials for eIDAS 2.0.

== History ==
=== Founding and early development ===
Evrotrust was founded in 2018 by Konstantin Bezuhanov, a financial specialist and CEO of Evrotrust, and George Dimitrov, an e-government expert. Within its first year of operations, the company focused on providing qualified trust solutions for businesses and government institutions. UniCredit Bulbank was one of Evrotrust’s first clients.

In 2021, Evrotrust partnered with MasterCard to implement digital identity services in North Macedonia, making it one of the first Balkan countries to implement a nationwide digital identity solution.

=== National eID scheme and EU notification ===
In 2023, Evrotrust was given the status of an eID scheme under the eIDAS legislation, enabling citizens of all EU member states to use Evrotrust's eID solution to identify themselves before businesses and organizations across the European Union. Evrotrust was recognized as a notified electronic identification (eID) scheme by the European Commission after it was validated by EU member states and its information was uploaded to the Official Journal of the European Union on July 5, 2023.

After a decision by the Council of Ministers of Bulgaria, Evrotrust's eID scheme was also named the country of Bulgaria's official identity program in 2023. Shortly afterwards, the company also expanded into Romania.

In 2024, Evrotrust was also officially registered as an electronic identity service provider by the Authority for the Digitalization of Romania (ADR) in Romania.

In 2025, Evrotrust joined the WE BUILD Consortium, a large-scale pilot working on the European Digital Identity Wallet. In the same year, Evrotrust also participated in the Breaking Grounds Initiative, which raises visibility for Bulgarian tech talent and investment opportunities.

In November 2025, Evrotrust secured €6.6 million to be used for building the European Digital Identity Wallet (EUDI Wallet) in Bulgaria.

== Products and services ==
=== Qualified trust services ===
Evrotrust provides an electronic identification service designed for customer onboarding and KYC, AML, and eIDAS 2.0 compliance. The eID solution performs remote identity verification using procedures such as identity attestation, facial recognition, liveness detection, and cross-checks against authoritative registries.

=== Platforms and integrations ===
The company’s user-facing product is a mobile app, a form of cloud-based or mobile electronic signature where users can identify themselves with biometric data and sign electronic documents. The app is available for iOS and Android devices.

=== EUDI Wallet and eIDAS 2.0 initiatives ===
Evrotrust is developing wallet‑ready digital credentials for the forthcoming European Digital Identity Wallet, focusing on selective disclosure, offline capabilities, and adherence to eIDAS 2.0 requirements.

== Awards and recognition ==
- 2018 - Evrotrust was chosen as one of the winners in the Elevator Lab Bulgaria competition.
- 2022 - In 2022, the company was included in The Deloitte Technology Fast 50 Central Europe ranking, a report that looks into tech businesses' percentage revenue growth.
- 2023 - The company was named one of the Top 10 KYC Solution Providers by the GRC Outlook.

== See also ==
- Digital identity
- eIDAS
- Know your customer
