= Registered mail =

Postal service

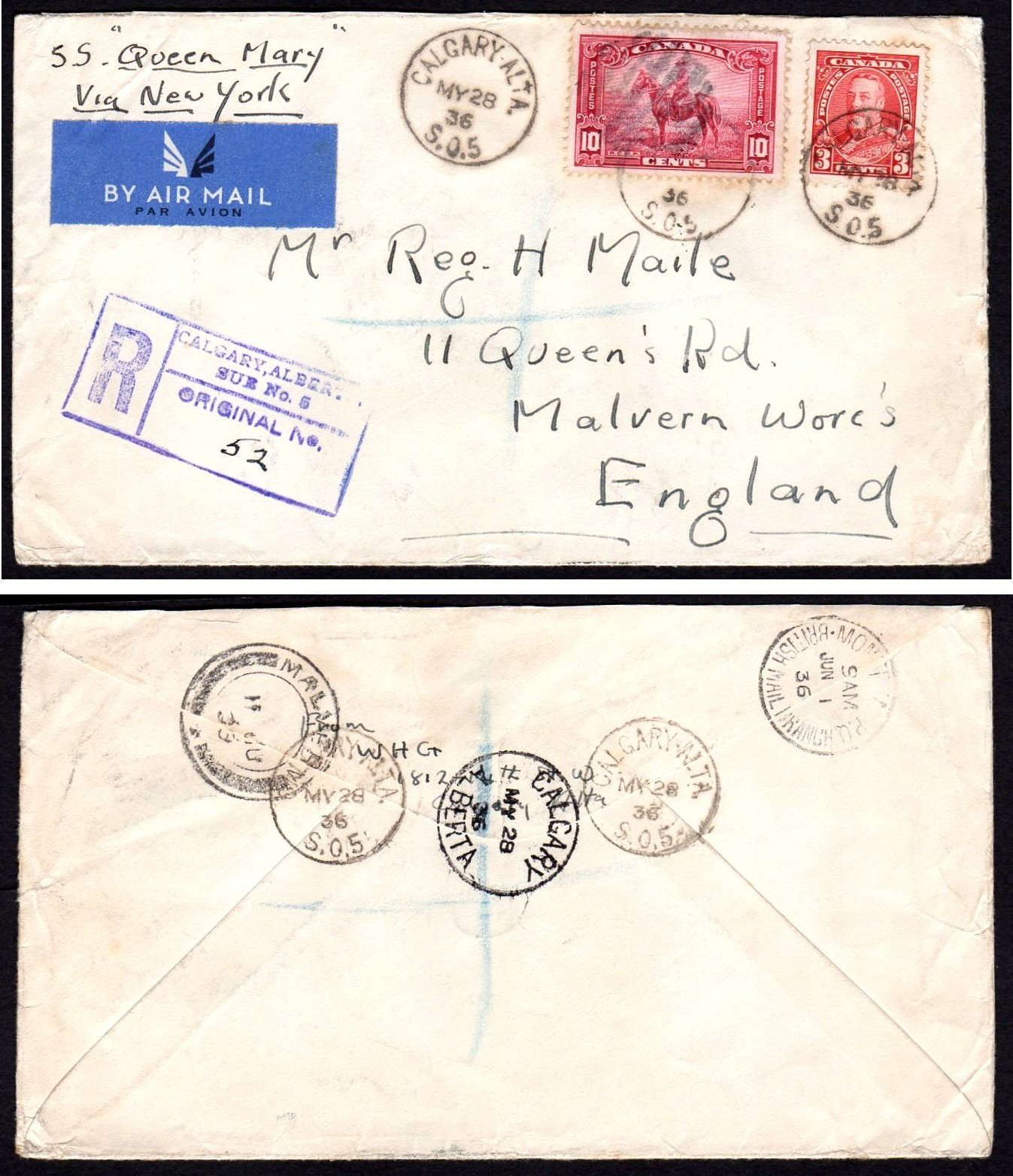
A 1936 registered letter from Canada to Great Britain sent via the RMS Queen Mary

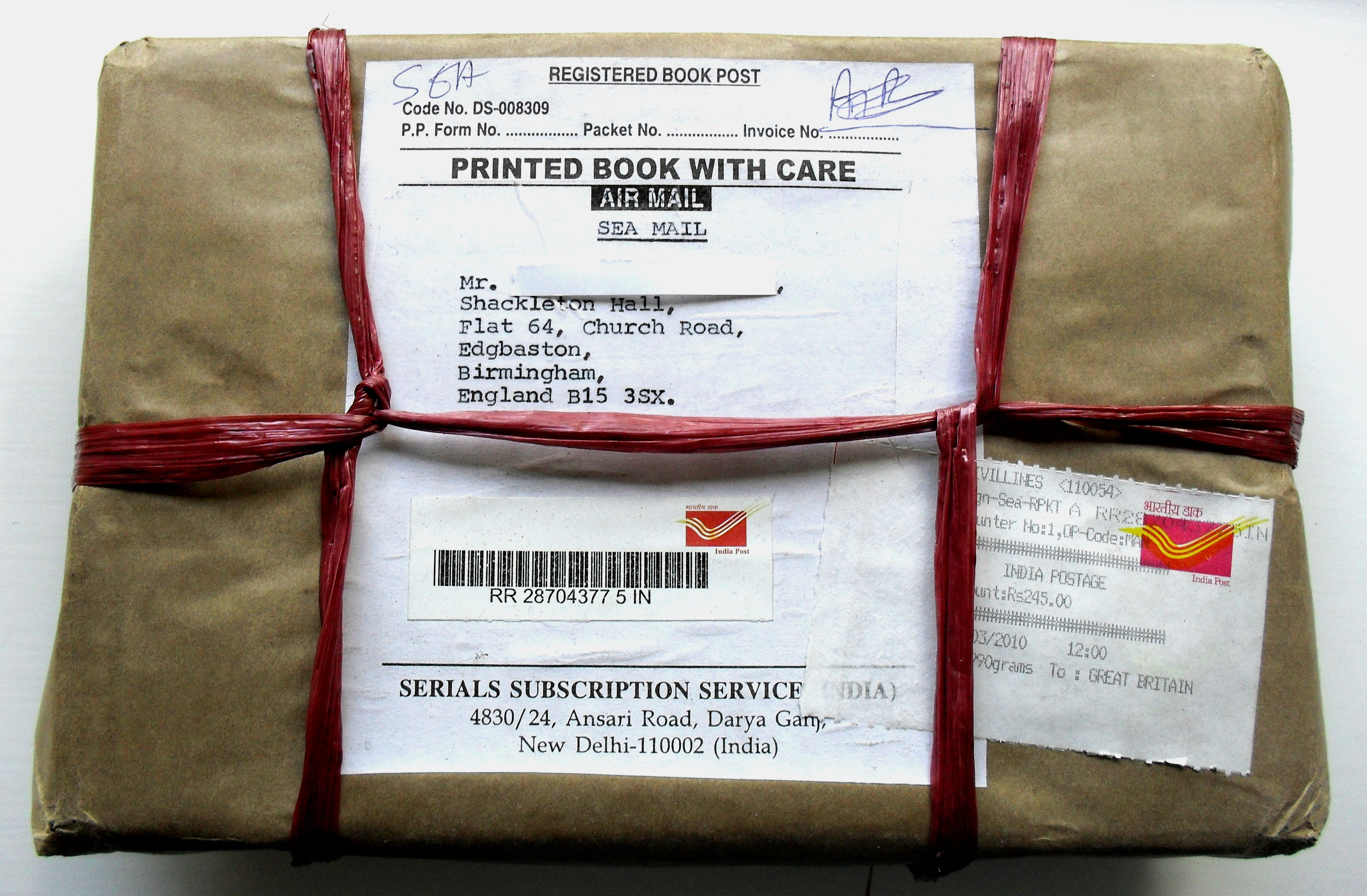
A registered parcel sent from India to the UK with electronic barcode registration

Registered mail is a postal service in many countries which allows the sender proof of mailing via a receipt and, upon request, electronic verification that an article was delivered or that a delivery attempt was made. Depending on the country, additional services may also be available, such as:

- a chain of custody, where the posted item has its details recorded in a register to enable its location to be tracked, sometimes with added insurance to cover loss;
- a return receipt, called an avis de réception, which provides a postcard or electronic notification with the date of delivery and recipient signature;
- restricted delivery, which confirms that only a specific person or authorized agent will receive the mail, and;
- certified mail, in the United States.

== Background ==
Traditionally, registered mail was a manual process which gave rise to a great variety of distinctive postal markings, like handstamps, and usage of registration labels. Many countries have issued special postal stationery and postage stamps for registered mail. Earlier similar services were known as Money Letters. Today, the registration process is largely computerized with barcode registration labels replacing the traditional analog labels having only a printed serial number.

Generally, the item is pre-paid with the normal postage rate and an additional charge known as a registration fee. Upon payment of this fee the sender is given a receipt, and (usually) a unique numbered registration label is affixed to the letter. As the letter travels from post office to post office and through any sorting office, it has to be signed for on a ledger. This process is completed when the letter is delivered and the receiver signs for the item. With computerization and barcode technology, much of the logging once done manually has become simpler and leads to greater options for the sender and receiver alike to access the status of their shipment via the internet. Many postal authorities provide tracing information for registered items on their website.

Internationally, the use of registered mail requires labels with a 13-digit reference number and corresponding barcode (UPU S10). The first two letters indicate registration (usually "RR") while the last two letters usually represent the country where the registered item was posted. E.g., RR913282511SG indicating Singapore, RB5584847749CN indicating China or RR123456785KR indicating South Korea.

== History ==
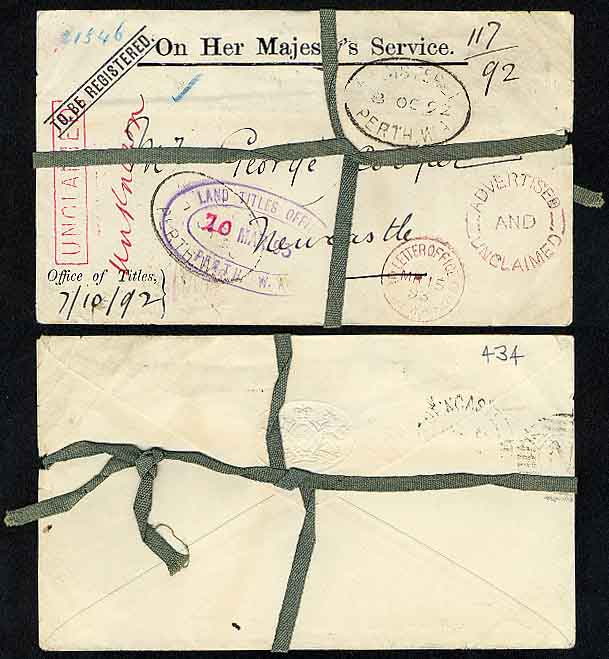
A Western Australia registered letter from 1892 complete with original green linen tape

The earliest reference to a mail registration system dates to July 1556, during the reign of Mary Tudor, of England. In that example, the poste between this and the Northe should eche of them keepe a booke and entrye of every letter that he shall receive, the tyme of the deliverie thereof unto his hands with the parties names that shall bring it unto him, whose handes he shall also take to his booke, witnessing the same note to be trewe. This was likely for state security rather than mail security. In 1603, another Order of Council was made whereby all letters had to be recorded. This system was, in effect, a registration system, although it applied to all items sent via the post.

William Dockwra's 1680s London Penny Post also recorded all details on letters accepted for onward transmission, but unlike the General Post Office, gave compensation for losses.

The registration of letters as known today was introduced in 1841 in Great Britain. The letter had to be enclosed within a large sheet of green paper. The green sheet was addressed to the Post Office where the recipient lived. The green sheet was then used as a receipt and was returned to the office of origin after delivery. On 1 July 1858 the green sheet was replaced by a green silk ribbon and shortly afterward by a green linen tape. In 1870 the tape was replaced by green string. On the introduction of postal stationery registration envelopes in 1878 the string was replaced by printed blue crossed lines. The blue crossed lines have survived on registered letters to the present day.

== Canada ==
Canada Post's Registered Mail service provides the sender with a mailing receipt, and upon delivery of the item, with the delivery date and a copy of the signature of the addressee or the addressee's representative. Registered Mail may include lettermail, documents, valuables, and literature for the blind, but does not include parcels.

== Israel ==
Israel Post's Registered Mail service (Hebrew: דֹּאַר רָשׁוּם, doar rashum) provides the sender with a mailing receipt, and upon delivery of the item, the addressee must sign in order to obtain the item. The sender can monitor the item until its delivery, for items intended for 84 cities in Israel. A confirmation of delivery is sent to the sender for an additional fee. Registered Mail may include letters, postcards and printed matter.

On 25 November 2015 a preliminary reading of an amendment to Postal Law that forces the sender to mention his name on an item sent via registered mail, was passed. According to the press, the major opposition to this bill is the Courts Administration that sends most of its mail via registered mail with a confirmation of delivery, and claims that knowing the identity of the sender, many of their addressees will choose not to accept the items, thus delaying the legal proceedings they are a party to.

== Sweden ==
PostNord's service Registered Mail (Swedish: Rekommenderad försändelse), often shortened as Rek, will only be delivered after the recipient have verified their identity with some form of ID card or BankID and had their personal identity number logged. The letter can also be collected by a courier, provided this courier carries both their own ID and the recipient's ID, or if the receiver have verified their identy in the app via BankID and sent a newly generated barcode to the courier. All Registered Mail is traceable in over 30 countries via PostNord's website and mobile app. Any domestic Registered Mail is insured for up to 10 000 SEK. International Registered Mail is insured for up to either 2 000 SEK or 10 000 SEK.

There is an optional added service called Personal Delivery (Swedish: Personlig utlämning) where only the recipient can collect the letter and denies all else, including couriers and power of attorney. Another optional added service is Advice of Delivery (Swedish: Mottagningsbevis) where a form signed by the receiver is sent back to the sender.

Registered Mail will be delivered to one of PostNord's service points, often a grocery store, where the identity of the receiver, and any courier, can be verified and logged before handing over the letter.

Since autumn 2017 Postnord no longer requires a signature when delivering registered mail from China Post. Registered mail from China Post is only traceable in the sense that the mailman marks the item as delivered when and if it is delivered to the recipient's mailbox. No proof that the recipient has received the mail is collected.

== United Kingdom ==
Since 1998, the Special Delivery service has been the only registered service offered by Royal Mail, after the old-style Registered Letter service was discontinued.

== United States ==
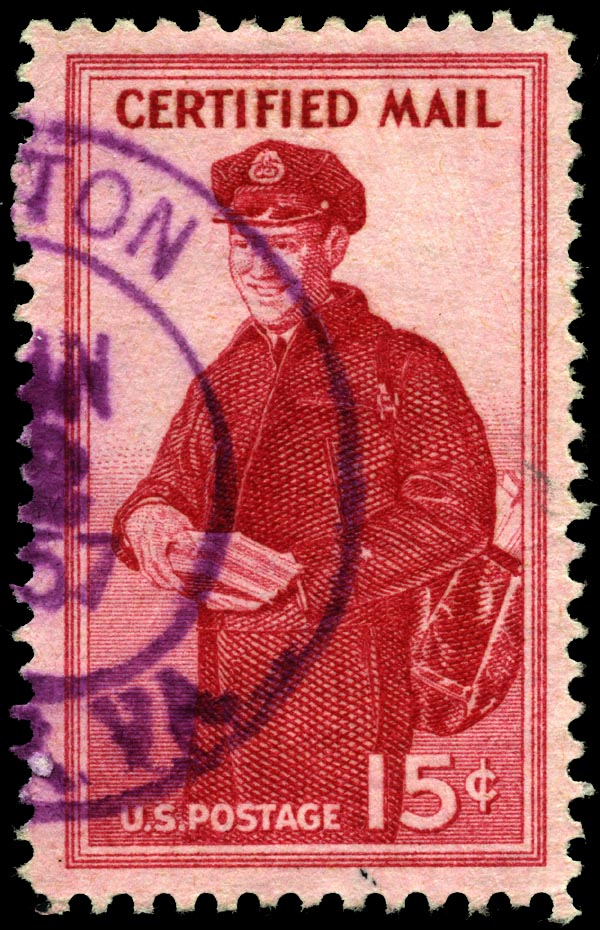
United States 15c certified mail stamp of 1955, postman, Scott catalog FA1. No further stamps were issued in this category.

Registered mail is offered by the United States Postal Service as an extra for First Class or Priority Mail shipments. It provides end-to-end security in locked containers and its custody records are maintained, but these are not normally provided to the customer unless a claim is filed. Registered mail may be used to send classified material up to the Secret classified level.

=== Certified mail ===
Since 1955, the U.S. Postal Service has offered Certified Mail as an alternative to registered mail. The service is designed to allow mailers to send important business and legal documents with tracking and verification, but at a lower cost than registered mail. Unlike registered mail, Certified Mail is transported alongside normal mail, without secure storage or chain of custody, which substantially lowers the cost. Certified Mail must be signed for upon delivery, and the Postal Service retains the signature record for two years. For an additional fee, senders can opt for "return receipt" service, which provides a paper or electronic signed record of delivery.

Certified Mail grew rapidly after its introduction and remains much more popular than registered mail in the United States. Its popularity is driven in part because its receipts and delivery notifications can be used for many official purposes, including as evidence of mailing and delivery in legal proceedings. Indeed, some state and local governments have enacted laws requiring the use of Certified Mail to transmit documents with legal significance, such as foreclosure notices and health insurance policy cancellations. In fiscal year 2016, Certified Mail accounted for 197 million pieces and $670 million in direct revenue, making it the largest of the USPS's ancillary services.

== Gallery ==
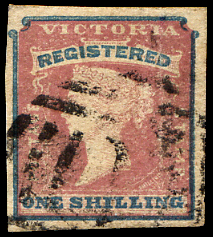
First registered postage stamp of Victoria (Australia) 1865, 1 shilling

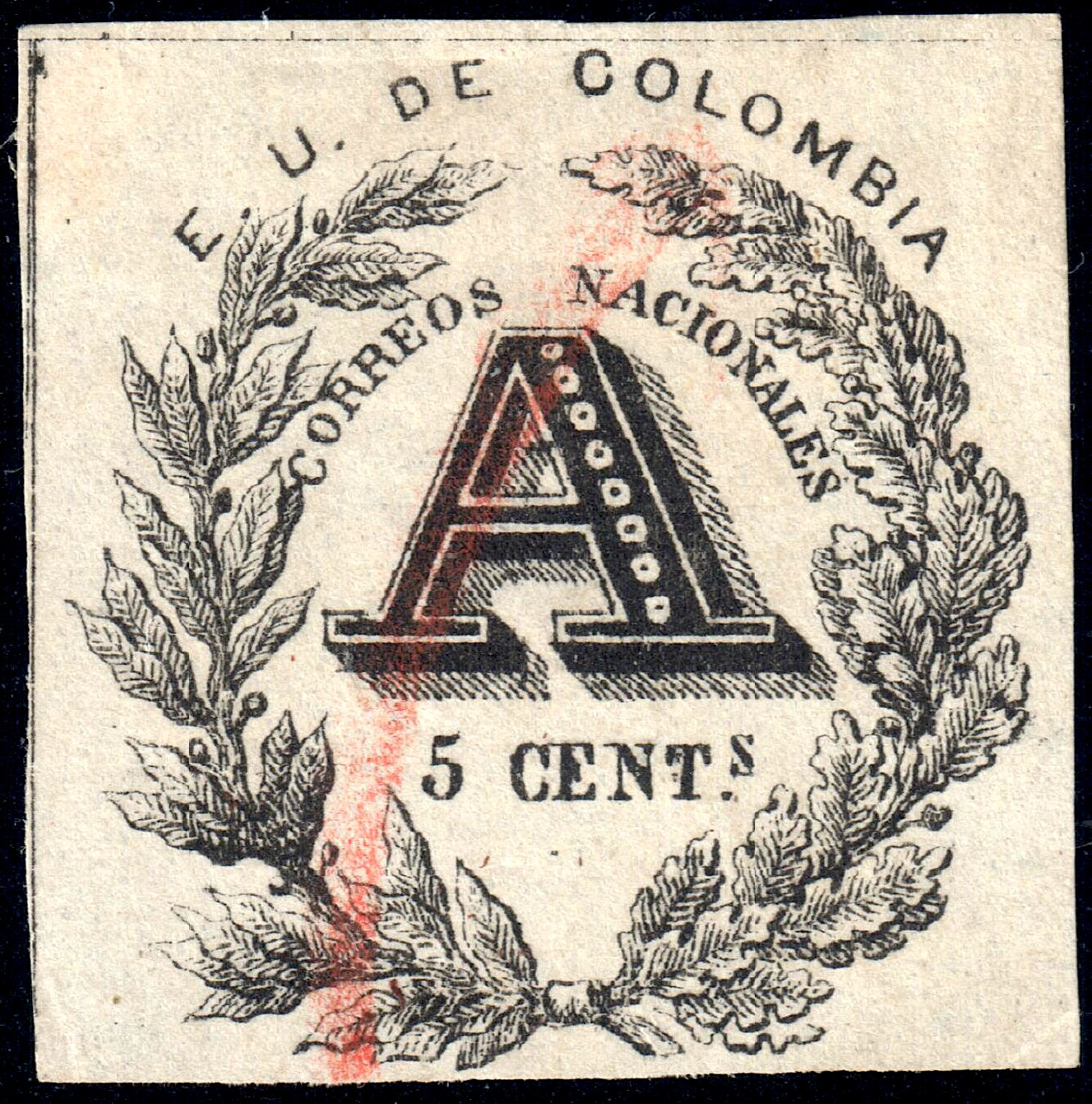
United States of Colombia 1865, 5c registration stamp 'A' (Anotacion)

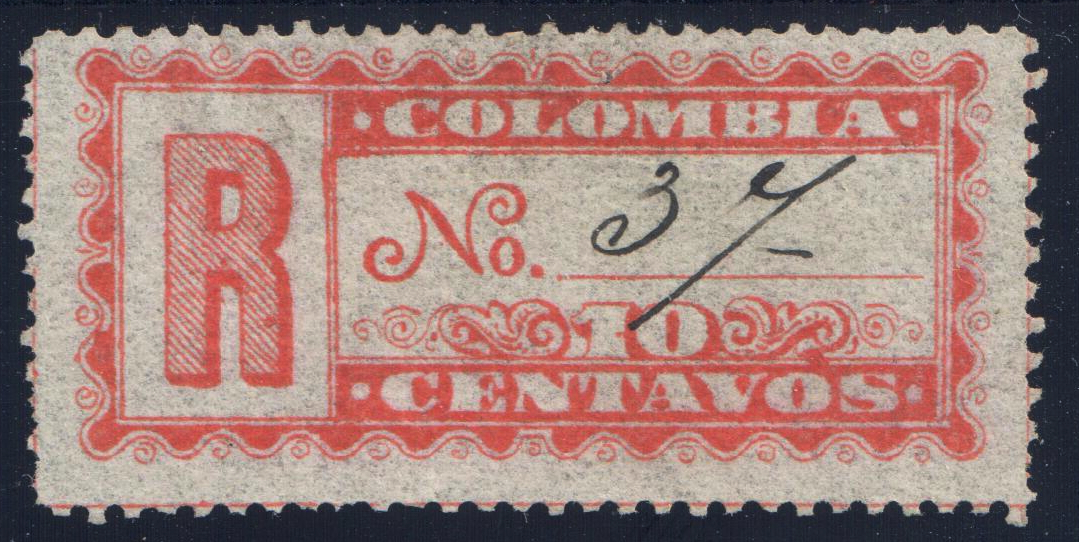
Colombia 1889, 10c registration stamp

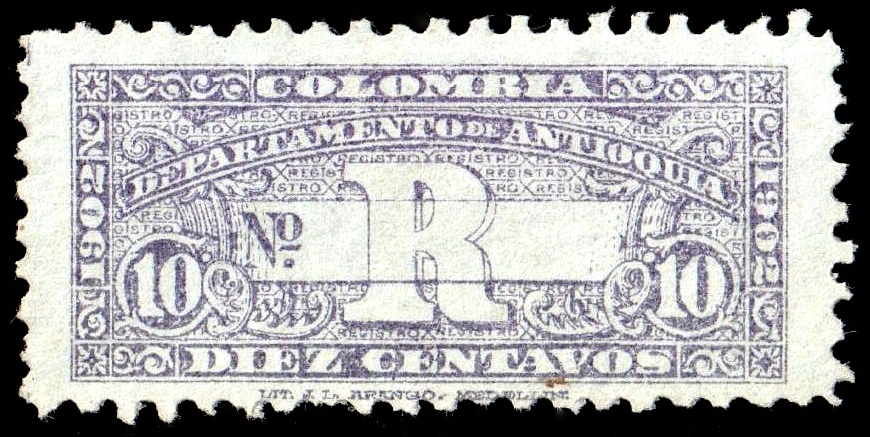
Antioquia 1902, 10c registration stamp

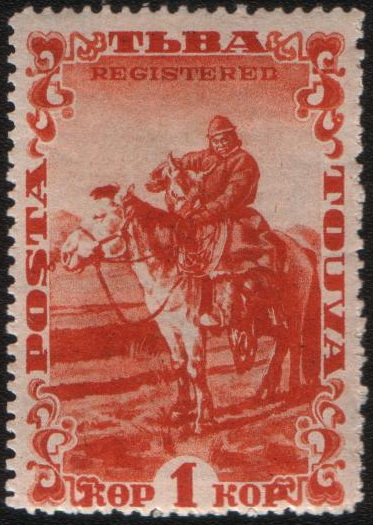
Tuva 1933, 1 kopeck registration stamp

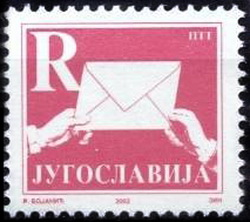
Yugoslavia 2002, registration stamp

== See also ==
- Express mail
- Registered envelope
- Certified email
