= John Harrison (engraver) =

British stamp engraver, born 1872

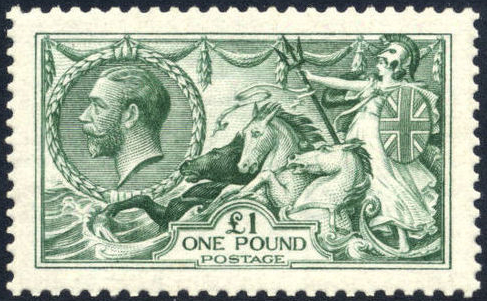
A 1913 Seahorse stamp engraved by Harrison.

John Augustus Charles Harrison (born Manchester, 5 August 1872; died Wimbledon, 25 January 1955) was a noted British stamp engraver whose work included the British Seahorse stamps of 1913.

== Biography ==
John Augustus Charles Harrison was the son of line-engraver, Samuel Harrison, and the grandson of John Harrison, a heraldic painter. Two of John’s three brothers, Thomas and Wilfred, were also engravers.

John A.C. Harrison was apprenticed to his father at the age of thirteen, while he attended art classes in Birmingham. Aged seventeen, Harrison joined the firm of Waterlow Brothers and Layton as an ornamental engraver. By the end of the century, however, Harrison had left their employment and was working as a self-employed engraver. He specialised in the design and production of line-engraved heraldic bookplates, which gained him a wide reputation for his skills, many of which were produced for the firm of J. & E. Bumpus of Oxford Street in London. Alongside his career as an engraver, Harrison was also a competent water-colourist and was interested in the stage: he was for many years a member of the Comedy Club of Streatham.

Harrison was commissioned by the Royal Mint to engrave the dies of several postage stamps, upon the death of King Edward VII in 1910. He became known for his mastery of both relief-engraving and line-engraving, which was only matched by Ferdinand Schirnbock (1859-1930).

In 1963 Harrison's son donated a collection of mostly British and British Commonwealth die proofs engraved by J.A.C. Harrison between 1911 and 1937 to the British Museum and it today forms part of the British Library Philatelic Collections.
