= Comparison of mail servers =

The comparison of mail servers covers mail transfer agents (MTAs), mail delivery agents, and other computer software that provide e-mail services.

Unix-based mail servers are built using a number of components because a Unix-style environment is, by default, a toolbox operating system. A stock Unix-like server already has internal mail; more traditional ones also come with a full MTA already part of the standard installation. To allow the server to send external emails, an MTA such as Sendmail, Postfix, or Exim is required. Mail is read either through direct access (shell login) or mailbox protocols like POP and IMAP. Unix-based MTA software largely acts to enhance or replace the respective system's native MTA.

Microsoft Windows servers do not natively implement e-mail, thus Windows-based MTAs have to supply all the necessary aspects of e-mail-related functionality.

== Feature comparison ==
	OS support			Protocol support							Features							Storage		License
Mail server	Linux/Unix	Windows	macOS	SMTP	POP3	IMAP	JMAP	IDLE	SMTPS	POP3S	IPv6	SSL	DANE	Webmail	ActiveSync	Sieve	IDN/UTF8	Database	File-based	License
agorum core	Yes	Yes	No	Yes	No	Yes	No	No	No	No	No	Yes	No	Yes	No	No	?	Yes	No	GPLv2
Apache James	Yes	Yes	Yes	Yes	Yes	Yes	Yes	Yes	Yes	Yes	?	Yes	?	No	No	Yes	?	Yes	Yes	ASLv2
Axigen	Yes	Yes	No	Yes	Yes	Yes	?	Yes	Yes	Yes	Yes	Yes	?	Ajax, Basic & Mobile	Yes	Yes	Yes	Embedded, Optimized for Email & Groupware	Yes	Proprietary (free version: 5 domains, 5 users, 5 groups)
Citadel	Yes	No	Yes	Yes	Yes	Yes	?	No	Yes	Yes	Yes	Yes	?	Yes	No	Yes	?	Yes	No	GPLv3
CommuniGate Pro	Yes	Yes	Yes	Yes	Yes	Yes	?	Yes	Yes	Yes	Yes	Yes	?	Yes	Yes	?	Yes	Yes	Yes	Proprietary (Free for up to 5 users)
Courier Mail Server	Yes	No	Yes	Yes	Yes	Yes	?	Yes	Yes	Yes	Yes	Yes	No	Yes	No	maildrop	Yes	No	maildir	GPLv3+
Cyrus IMAP	Yes	No	Yes	No	Yes	Yes	Yes	Yes	No	Yes	Yes	Yes	No	No	No	Yes	No	Indexes only	Yes	BSD 4-clause
DBMail	Yes	No	Yes	No	Yes	Yes	No	Yes	No	Yes	Yes	Yes	No	No	No	No	Yes	Yes	No	GPLv2
Dovecot	Yes	No	Yes	Yes	Yes	Yes	No	Yes	Yes	Yes	Yes	Yes	No	No	No	Yes	No	Yes	maildir, mbox, dbox, mdbox, obox	Mixed: MIT and LGPL-2.1
Eudora Internet Mail Server	No	No	Yes	Yes	Yes	Yes	?	?	No	No	?	No	?	No	No	?	?	No	No	Proprietary
Exim	Yes	Yes (via Cygwin)	Yes	Yes	No	No	?	No	Yes	No	Yes	Yes	Yes	No	No	Yes	Yes	Yes	Yes	GPLv2+
FirstClass	Yes	Yes	Yes	Yes	Yes	Yes	?	?	Yes	Yes	?	Yes	?	Yes	Yes	?	?	Yes	Yes	Proprietary
Gordano Messaging Suite	Yes	Yes	No	Yes	Yes	Yes	?	Yes	Yes	Yes	?	Yes	?	Yes	Yes	No	?	Yes	Yes	Proprietary
GroupWise	Yes	Yes	No	Yes	Yes	Yes	?	?	Yes	Yes	?	Yes	?	Yes	Yes	?	?	Yes	No	Proprietary
Halon	Yes	No	No	Yes	No	No	?	No	Yes	No	Yes	Yes	Yes	No	No	?	Yes	Yes	Yes	Proprietary
Haraka	Yes	Yes	Yes	Yes	No	No	?	No	Yes	No	Yes	Yes	?	No	No	?	Yes	Yes	Yes	MIT
hMailServer	No	Yes	No	Yes	Yes	Yes	?	Yes	Yes	Yes	Yes	Yes	?	Yes	No	?	No	Yes	Yes	GNU AGPL
HCL Domino	Yes	Yes	No	Yes	Yes	Yes	No	No	Yes	Yes	Yes	Yes	No	Yes	Yes	No	Yes	Yes	No	Proprietary
IceWarp Mail Server	Yes	Yes	Yes	Yes	Yes	Yes	?	Yes	Yes	Yes	Yes	Yes	No	Yes	Yes	No	?	Yes	Yes	Proprietary
Ipswitch IMail Server	No	Yes	No	Yes	Yes	Yes	?	Yes (since v12.2)	Yes	Yes	?	Yes	?	Yes	Yes	?	?	No	Yes	Proprietary
Kerio Connect	Yes	Yes	Yes	Yes	Yes	Yes	?	Yes	Yes	Yes	Yes	Yes	?	Yes	Yes	Yes	?	No	Yes	Proprietary
Kolab	Yes	No	No	Yes	Yes	Yes	?	Yes	Yes	Yes	Yes	Yes	Yes	Yes	Yes	Yes	?	Yes	Yes	GPLv3
Kopano	Yes	No	No	postfix, etc.	Yes	Yes	No	Yes	postfix	Yes	Yes	Yes	postfix	Yes	z-push	No	Yes	SQL	Yes	AGPLv3, paid
KumoMTA	Yes	No	No	Yes	No	No	?	No	Yes	No	Yes	Yes	Yes	No	No	Lua	Yes	Yes	Yes	ASLv2
maddy	Yes	No	source builds only	Yes	No	Yes	No	Yes	Yes	No	Yes	Yes	Yes	No	No	No	Yes	SQLite or PostgreSQL index	message bodies	GPLv3+
Mailsite	No	Yes	No	Yes	Yes	Yes	?	?	Yes	Yes	?	Yes	?	Yes	Yes	Yes	?	Yes	Yes	Proprietary
Mailtraq	No	Yes	No	Yes	Yes	Yes	?	Yes	Yes	Yes	?	Yes	?	Yes	No	?	?	Yes	Yes	Proprietary
MDaemon	No	Yes	No	Yes	Yes	Yes	?	Yes	Yes	Yes	Yes	Yes	No	Yes	Yes	No	Not IMAP	No	Yes	Proprietary
Mercury Mail Transport System	No	Yes	No	Yes	Yes	Yes	?	Yes	Yes	Yes	No	Yes	No	Yes	No	No	No	No	Yes	Proprietary donationware
Microsoft Exchange Server	No	Yes	No	Yes	Yes	Yes	No	Yes	Yes	Yes	Yes	Yes	No	Yes	Yes	3rd Party support	Not IMAP	Yes	Yes	Proprietary
mox	Yes	compiles, but the server does not yet run	Yes	Yes	No	Yes	No	Yes	Yes	No	Yes	Yes	Yes	Yes	No	No	Yes	message index	message bodies	MIT
NetMail	Yes	Yes	No	Yes	Yes	Yes	?	?	Yes	Yes	?	Yes	?	Yes	No	?	?	Yes	No	Proprietary
OpenSMTPD	Yes	No	Yes	Yes	No	No	No	No	Yes	No	Yes	Yes	No	No	No	No	No	via custom backends	Yes	ISC
Open-Xchange	Yes	No	No	Yes	Yes	Yes	?	?	Yes	Yes	?	Yes	?	Yes	Yes	?	?	Yes	No	Proprietary/SaaS, with open-source parts
Oracle Communications Messaging Server	Yes	No	No	Yes	Yes	Yes	?	?	Yes	Yes	?	Yes	?	Yes	No	?	Yes	Yes	Yes	Proprietary
Postfix	Yes	No	Yes	Yes	No	No	?	No	Yes	No	Yes	Yes	Yes	No	No	No	Yes	Yes	Yes	IBM Public License
qmail	Yes	No	Yes	Yes	Yes	No	No	No	with ucspi-ssl, with patch	with ucspi-ssl	s/qmail, via Qsmtp	with ucspi-ssl, with patch	s/qmail	No	No	No	s/qmail	(cdb)	Yes	Public domain
Qpopper	Yes	Yes (via Cygwin)	Yes	No	Yes	No	?	No	No	Yes	?	Yes	?	No	No	?	?	No	Yes	BSD-style (GPL-incompatible)
Scalix	Yes	No	No	Yes	Yes	Yes	?	Yes	Yes (via Stunnel)	Yes (via Stunnel)	?	Yes (via Stunnel)	?	Yes	Yes	?	?	Yes	Yes	Proprietary with OSS parts, a community (Freeware) and 3 paid editions (SMB, Enterprise, Hosting)
Sendmail	Yes	No	Yes	Yes	No	No	?	No	Yes	No	Yes	Yes	Yes (since 8.16)	No	No	No	Yes	?	Yes	Sendmail License
SparkEngine	Yes	Yes	Yes	Yes	No	No	?	No	Yes	No	?	Yes	?	No	No	?	?	Yes	Yes	Proprietary
Stalwart	Yes	Yes	Yes	Yes	Yes	Yes	Yes	Yes	Yes	Yes	Yes	Yes	Yes	administration and self-service consoles only	No	Yes	Yes	RocksDB, FoundationDB, PostgreSQL, MySQL or SQLite	message bodies	AGPLv3, with a proprietary Enterprise edition
UW IMAP	Yes	Yes	Yes	No	Yes	Yes	?	Yes	No	Yes	Yes	Yes	No	WebPine	No	No	?	Yes (Indexes)	Yes	Apache License 2.0
WinGate	No	Yes	No	Yes	Yes	Yes	?	Yes	Yes	Yes	No	Yes	?	Yes	No	?	?	No	Yes	Proprietary
Zarafa	Yes	No	No	postfix etc.	Yes	Yes	No	Yes	postfix	Yes	Yes	Yes	postfix	Yes	z-push	No	No	SQL	Yes	AGPLv3, paid
Zentyal	Yes	No	No	Yes	Yes	Yes	?	Yes	Yes	Yes	No	Yes	?	Yes	Yes	?	?	Yes	Yes	Proprietary, 45-day trial
Zimbra	Yes	No	Yes	Yes	Yes	Yes	?	Yes	Yes	Yes	Yes	Yes	Yes	Yes	Yes	Yes	No	Yes	Yes	ZPL and proprietary editions
Mail server	Linux/Unix	Windows	macOS	SMTP	POP3	IMAP	JMAP	IDLE	SMTPS	POP3S	IPv6	SSL	DANE	Webmail	ActiveSync	Sieve	IDN/UTF8	Database	File-based	License

== Authentication ==
Mail server	SMTP AUTH	POP before SMTP	APOP	File System	Database	LDAP	Native Anti Hammer-Brute-force attack protection	Other
agorum core	Yes	No	No	No	Yes	Yes	?	PLAIN, LOGIN, CRAM-MD5, NTLM
Apache James	Yes	?	?	?	Yes	Yes	?	PLAIN, LOGIN
Axigen	Yes	No	Yes	Yes	No	Yes	No	GSSAPI, CRAM-MD5, DIGEST-MD5, APOP, CLRTXT, LOGIN, PLAIN, LDAP, Internal
CommuniGate Pro	Yes	Yes	Yes	Yes	Yes	Yes	?	Active Directory (LDAP), CLRTXT, CRAM-MD5, DIGEST-MD5, APOP, GSSAPI, NTLM, MSN, SESSIONID, External Authentication Plug-in. Also supports X.509 PKI auth via STARTTLS/SSL
Courier Mail Server	Yes	Yes	Yes	Yes	Yes	Yes	?	Managed by Courier authentication library which can use PAM, Userdb, PostgreSQL(beta), MySQL, LDAP, and EXTERNAL.
Cyrus IMAP	Yes	Yes	Yes	Yes	Yes	Yes	?	Supports X.509 PKI auth via STARTTLS and EXTERNAL. Uses Cyrus SASL authentication library for support for other mechanisms: Berkeley DB, GDBM, or NDBM (sasldb), PAM, MySQL, PostgreSQL, SQLite, LDAP, Active Directory(LDAP), DCE, Kerberos 4 and 5, proxied IMAP auth, getpwent, shadow, SIA, Courier Authdaemon, httpform, APOP and SASL mechanisms: ANONYMOUS, CRAM-MD5, DIGEST-MD5, SCRAM-SHA-1(-PLUS), SCRAM-SHA-224(-PLUS), SCRAM-SHA-256(-PLUS), SCRAM-SHA-384(-PLUS), SCRAM-SHA-512(-PLUS), EXTERNAL, GSSAPI, LOGIN, NTLM, OTP, PASSDSS, PLAIN, SRP
DBMail	No	No	No	No	Yes	Yes	No	LOGIN, Active Directory, OpenLDAP
Dovecot	Yes	Yes	Yes	Yes	Yes	Yes	?	Submission service supports SMTP AUTH. Offers SASL to MTAs. POP-before-SMTP via DRAC plugin. PAM, MySQL, PostgreSQL, SQLite, LDAP, Active Directory(LDAP), Kerberos 5, proxied IMAP auth, getpwent, shadow, SIA, BSDauth, Vpopmail. APOP and SASL mechanisms: ANONYMOUS, PLAIN, LOGIN, CRAM-MD5, DIGEST-MD5, SCRAM-SHA-1, EXTERNAL, GSSAPI, NTLM, OTP, SKEY, RPA.
Eudora Internet Mail Server	Yes	No	Yes	Yes	No	No	Yes	CRAM-MD5, DIGEST-MD5, PLAIN, LOGIN
Exim	Yes	Yes	Yes	Yes	Yes	Yes	?	Cyrus SASL, Dovecot SASL, GNU SASL, CRAM-MD5, Heimdal GSSAPI, PLAIN, LOGIN, SPA
FirstClass	Yes	?	?	Yes	Yes	Yes	?	
Gordano Messaging Suite	Yes	Yes	Yes	No	Yes	Yes	?	PLAIN, LOGIN, CRAM-MD5, DIGEST-MD5, APOP, ODBC, Active Directory, NT Domain
GroupWise	Yes	Yes	Yes	Yes	Yes	Yes	?	eDirectory, Any LDAPv3-compliant source
Halon	Yes	No	No	Yes	Yes	Yes	?	Many mechanism (SMTP callout, Dovecot SASL, REST, etc.) via script.
Haraka	Yes	No	No	Yes	Yes	Yes	?	Proxy to other server, any other mechanism via AUTH plugins.
HCL Domino	Yes	No	No	No	Yes	Yes	Yes	Passkeys, Time-based one-time password
IceWarp Mail Server	Yes	Yes	Yes	Yes	Yes	Yes	?	PLAIN, LOGIN, CRAM-MD5, NTLM
Ipswitch IMail Server	Yes	No	Yes	Yes	Yes	Yes	Yes	Active Directory, Windows authentication, CRAM-MD5, PLAIN, LOGIN
Kolab	Yes	Yes	Yes	Yes	Yes	Yes	?	Kolab employs Cyrus and Postfix and thus supports all Cyrus SASL authentication methods and X.509 PKI auth via STARTTLS and EXTERNAL.
maddy	Yes	No	No	Yes	Yes	Yes	per-IP rate and concurrency limits; ships fail2ban rules	PLAIN, LOGIN
Mailsite	Yes	No	Yes	Yes	Yes	Yes	?	NT Domain, Active Directory, PLAIN, LOGIN, NTLM, SCRAM-MD5, CRAM-MD5
Mailtraq	Yes	Yes	Yes	Yes	Yes	Yes	?	NT Domain, Active Directory, Local Directory
MDaemon	Yes	No	Yes	No	No	Yes	Yes	
Mercury Mail Transport System	Yes	Yes	Yes	Yes	No	?	?	Internal, LOGIN, PLAIN, CRAM-MD5, Netware, LDAP?, partial NT Domain
Microsoft Exchange Server	Yes	?	Yes	No	No	Yes	Yes	Active Directory, LOGIN, NTLM
mox	Yes	No	No	No	Yes	No	Yes	PLAIN, LOGIN, CRAM-MD5, SCRAM-SHA-1, SCRAM-SHA-256 (both with channel binding variants), EXTERNAL
NetMail	Yes	Yes	Yes	Yes	Yes	Yes	?	eDirectory, LDAP
Oracle Communications Messaging Server	Yes	Yes	Yes	Yes	Yes	Yes	?	Plain, Login, CRAM-MD5, DIGEST-MD5, Certificate
OpenSMTPD	Yes	No	No	Yes	Yes	Yes	No	By default PLAIN and LOGIN over SSL only, Certificates, bsd_auth and PAM. Supports adding new authentication mechanisms through custom backends.
Postfix	Yes	No	No	Yes	Yes	Yes	Yes	Supports all Cyrus SASL authentication methods except for APOP.
Qpopper	No	Yes	Yes	Yes	Yes	Yes	?	Pluggable Authentication Modules, GSSAPI, CRAM-MD5, DIGEST-MD5, APOP, PLAIN, LDAP, CMU SASL library, Kerberos
qmail	with patch, s/qmail	with vpopmail	Yes	Yes	Yes	Yes	?	Works with any checkpassword utility. The original supports only LOGIN and PLAIN. Alternate checkpassword utilities support authentication against PAM, LDAP, and databases.
Scalix	Yes	?	Yes	Yes	Yes	Yes	?	Internal, LOGIN, PLAIN, X.500 (DAP), LDAP, OpenLDAP, Active Directory, eDirectory, Kerberos, etc.
Sendmail	Yes	Yes	No	Yes	Yes	Yes	?	Supports all Cyrus SASL authentication methods except for APOP. Also supports X.509 PKI auth via STARTTLS and EXTERNAL.
Stalwart	Yes	No	No	No	Yes	Yes	built-in auto-banning	PLAIN, LOGIN, OAUTHBEARER, XOAUTH2; also OAuth 2.0, OpenID Connect and TOTP two-factor authentication
WinGate	Yes	Yes	Yes	Yes	Yes	No	?	NT Domain, Active Directory, CRAM-MD5, SASL PLAIN, SASL LOGIN
Zarafa	Yes	No	No	Yes	Yes	Yes	?	PLAIN, LOGIN using internal backends: Internal, Active Directory, any LDAP-compatible source, Unix
Zentyal	Yes	Yes	Yes	Yes	Yes	Yes	?	Active Directory using Dovecot SASL mechanisms
Zimbra	Yes	No	Yes	Yes	Yes	Yes	?	Internal, LDAP, Open LDAP, Active Directory
Mail server	SMTP AUTH	POP before SMTP	APOP	File System	Database	LDAP	Native Anti Hammer-Brute-force attack protection	Other Authentication possibilites

== Antispam features ==
Mail Server	DNSBL	SURBL	Spamtraps	Greylisting	SPF	DKIM	DMARC	Tarpit	Bayesian filters	Regular expressions	Embedded Antivirus	Embedded Antispam
agorum core	No	No	No	No	No	No	No	No	No	Yes	No	No
Apache James	?	?	?	?	?	?	?	?	Yes	?	Yes ClamAV	Optional (Apache SpamAssassin)
Axigen	Yes	No	Yes	Yes	Yes	Yes	No	No	Yes, in SpamAssassin	Yes	Yes CYREN	Yes CYREN
Citadel	Yes	Yes	No	No	Optional (via SpamAssassin)	Yes	?	No	Optional (via SpamAssassin)	No	Optional (ClamAV)	Optional (SpamAssassin)
Courier Mail Server	Yes	?	Yes	Yes	Yes	Optional	Optional	Yes	Yes	Yes	Yes Clamav	Yes
Dovecot	No	No	?	?	?	?	?	?	?	?	?	?
Eudora Internet Mail Server	Yes	?	Yes	Yes	?	?	?	?	?	?	?	?
Exim	Yes	Yes	Yes	Yes	Optional (at build time, most distributions do)	Optional (at build time, most distributions do)	Optional (at build time, most distributions do)	Yes	Optional with spamassassin etc.	Yes	Optional any	Optional any
FirstClass	Yes	Yes	No	?	Yes	?	?	Yes	Yes	Yes	Yes Symantec	?
Gordano Messaging Suite	Yes	Yes	Yes	Yes	Yes	?	?	Yes	Yes	Yes	Yes CYREN, Authentium	Yes CYREN
GroupWise	Yes	?	?	?	?	?	?	?	?	?	?	?
Halon	Yes	Yes	Yes	Yes	Yes	Yes	Yes	Yes	Optional (via SpamAssassin)	Yes	Optional (Sophos, ClamAV)	Optional (CYREN, SpamAssassin, Eleven eXpurgate)
Haraka	Yes	Yes	Yes	Yes	Yes	Yes	?	Yes	Optional with spamassassin etc.	Yes	Optional ClamAV, AVG, any via plugins	Optional SpamAssassin, MessageSniffer
HCL Domino	Yes	?	?	?	Yes	Yes	?	?	?	?	Optional with ICAP	?
hMailServer	Yes	Yes	No	Yes	Yes	Yes	?	No	No	Yes	Yes ClamAV	Yes SpamAssassin
IceWarp Mail Server	Yes	Yes	Yes	Yes	Yes	?	?	Yes	Yes	Yes	Yes	Yes
Ipswitch IMail Server	Yes	Yes	No	No	Yes	Yes	Yes	No	Yes	Yes	Yes Symantec, BitDefender	Yes CYREN
Kolab	Yes	?	?	Yes	Yes	?	?	?	Optional with spamassassin etc.	Yes	Optional (via content filter interface)	Optional (via content filter interface)
maddy	Yes	No	No	No	Yes	Yes	policy enforcement only; no report generation	No	No	address matching	Optional (via a milter, e.g. ClamAV)	Optional (via Rspamd)
Mailsite	Yes	Yes	Yes	Yes	Yes	?	?	No	Yes	Yes	Yes	Yes
Mailtraq	?	?	?	?	?	?	?	?	?	?	?	?
MDaemon	Yes	Yes (via SpamAssassin)	Yes	Yes	Yes	Yes	Yes	Yes	Yes (via SpamAssassin)	Yes (via Content Filter)	Optional Cyren, ClamAV	Yes SpamAssassin
Mercury Mail Transport System	Yes	?	?	Yes (GreyWall extension)	?	?	?	?	Yes (SpamHalter extension)	?	Yes (ClamWall extension)	?
Microsoft Exchange Server	Yes (2003 & later)	?	?	Yes	Yes	Optional (Signing only via 3rd Party Extensions)	?	Yes (2003 & later)	?	?	?	?
mox	Yes	No	No	delays first-time and low-reputation senders instead	Yes	Yes	Yes	Yes	Yes	Yes	No	Yes
NetMail	?	?	?	?	?	?	?	?	?	?	?	?
OpenSMTPD	?	?	?	?	Yes	Optional	Optional	?	?	?	?	?
Oracle Communications Messaging Server	Yes	Yes	Yes	Yes	Yes	?	?	Yes	Optional with spamassassin etc.	Yes	Optional any	Optional any
Postfix	Yes	Yes (via milter-link)	?	Yes	Yes	Optional	Optional	Yes	Optional with spamassassin etc.	Yes	Optional (via content filter interface)	Optional (via content filter interface)
qmail	Yes	with patch	?	Yes	with patch, s/qmail	with patch, s/qmail	?	with patch, s/qmail	No	?	No	No
Scalix	Yes	Yes (via Scalix AntiSpam powered by Cyren or SpamAssassin)	Yes (via Scalix AntiSpam powered by Cyren or SpamAssassin)	Yes	Yes (via Scalix AntiSpam powered by Cyren or SpamAssassin)	Yes (via Scalix AntiSpam powered by Cyren or SpamAssassin)	Yes (via Scalix AntiSpam powered by Cyren or SpamAssassin)	Yes	Yes	Yes	Yes (via Scalix ZeroHour AntiVirus powered by Cyren or ClamAV)	Yes
Sendmail	Yes	Yes (via milter/SA)	?	Yes	Optional	Optional	Optional	?	Optional with spamassassin etc.	Yes	Yes ClamAV	Yes SpamAssassin
SparkEngine	?	?	?	?	?	?	?	?	?	?	?	?
Stalwart	Yes	Yes	Yes	Yes	Yes	Yes	Yes	rate limiting and auto-banning	statistical classifier	Yes	No	Yes
UW IMAP	?	?	?	?	?	?	?	?	?	?	?	?
WinGate	?	?	?	?	?	?	?	?	?	?	?	?
Zarafa	External	External	External	External	External	External	External	External	External	External	External	External
Zimbra	Yes	Yes (via SpamAssassin)	?	Yes (via Cluebringer Policy Daemon)	Yes	Yes	?	Yes	Yes	Yes (partially)	Yes (via ClamAV, optionally any via Amavisd)	Yes (via SpamAssassin)
Mail Server	DNSBL	SURBL	Spamtraps	Greylisting	SPF	DKIM	DMARC	Tarpit	Bayesian filters	Regular expressions	Embedded Antivirus	Embedded Antispam

== See also ==
- Comparison of email clients
- List of email archive software
- List of mail server software
