= List of mail server software =

This is a list of mail server software: mail transfer agents, mail delivery agents, and other computer software which provide e-mail.

== Product statistics ==
All such figures are necessarily estimates because data about mail server share is difficult to obtain; there are few reliable primary sources—and no agreed methodologies for its collection.

Surveys probing Internet-exposed systems typically attempt to identify systems via their banner, or other identifying features. As of December 2023, Postfix and exim appeared to be the overwhelming leaders in mail server types, with greater than 92% share between them, having come to prominence before 2010 in each case. (Note: The following server types are mentioned in the Mail (MX) Server Survey but are not represented here - ArGoSoft, GroupWise, InterScan VirusWall, MagicMail, MessageWall, ModusMail, Neon Mail Server, OpenVMS, Post.Office, Trend Micro, VisNetic.) While such methods are effective at identifying mail server share for receiving systems, most large-scale sending environments are not listening for traffic on the public internet and will not be counted using such methodologies.

== Simple Mail Transfer Protocol (SMTP) ==
- agorum core
- Apache James
- Axigen
- Chasquid
- Citadel
- CommuniGate Pro (Note: mentioned in Mail (MX) Server Survey 2023)
- Courier
- Eudora Internet Mail Server
- Exim
- FirstClass
- Gordano Messaging Suite
- Halon Engage & Protect
- Haraka
- HCL Domino / formerly IBM Lotus Domino
- hMailServer
- IceWarp Mail Server (formerly Merak Mail Server)
- Ipswitch IMail Server
- Ironport
- Kerio Connect
- Koukan
- MailEnable
- Mailtraq
- MDaemon
- Mercury Mail Transport System
- MeTA1
- Microsoft Exchange Server
- MMDF
- Novell NetMail
- OpenSMTPD
- Openwave Systems
- Open-Xchange
- Oracle Beehive
- Oracle Communications Messaging Server
- Poste.io
- Postfix
- PowerMTA
- qmail
- qpsmtpd
- RaidenMAILD
- Scalix
- Sendmail
- Smail
- SparkEngine
- Stalwart Mail Server
- Sun Java System
- Surgemail
- vSMTP
- WinGate
- WinWebMail
- XMail (Note: uses ESMTP protocol)
- Zimbra
- ZMailer

== Post Office Protocol (POP) or Internet Message Access Protocol (IMAP) ==
- agorum core
- Apache James
- Axigen
- Bongo
- Citadel/UX
- CommuniGate Pro
- Courier Mail Server
- Cyrus IMAP server
- Dovecot
- Eudora Internet Mail Server
- FirstClass
- Gordano Messaging Suite
- hMailServer
- IceWarp Mail Server (formerly Merak Mail Server)
- Ipswitch IMail Server
- HCL Domino / formerly IBM Lotus Domino
- Kerio Connect
- Kopano
- Mailtraq
- MDaemon
- Mercury Mail Transport System
- Microsoft Exchange Server
- Mirapoint Email Appliance
- Novell GroupWise
- Novell NetMail
- Open-Xchange
- Oracle Beehive
- Oracle Communications Messaging Server
- Qpopper
- RaidenMAILD
- Stalwart Mail Server
- UW IMAP
- WinGate
- WinWebMail
- Zarafa
- Zentyal
- Zimbra

== JSON Meta Application Protocol (JMAP) ==
- Apache James
- Cyrus IMAP server
- Stalwart Mail server

== Mail filtering ==
- Anti-Spam SMTP Proxy
- Axigen
- Bogofilter
- Clearswift Secure Email Gateway
- DSPAM
- fdm
- Gordano Messaging Suite
- IceWarp Mail Server
- Libraesva
- MailChannels
- MailScanner
- Mailtraq
- MDaemon
- Mimecast
- MIMEDefang
- procmail
- Proxmox Mail Gateway
- PureMessage
- Rspamd
- SurfControl
- SpamAssassin
- Thexyz
- WinGate
- Webroot
- Proofpoint, Inc.

== Mail server packages ==
- docker-mailserver
- iRedmail
- Maddy Mail Server
- Mail-in-a-Box
- Mailcow
- Mailu
- Modoboa
- Mox
- Postal
- Poste.io
- Stalwart Mail Server

== Tools ==
- Swaks (Swiss Army Knife for SMTP)

== See also ==
- Comparison of mail servers
- Message transfer agent
