= MailEnable =

Windows-based commercial email server

- Developer: MaiEnable Pty.
- Release: 2001; 25 years ago
- Stable release: 10.52 / 31 March 2025; 18 months ago
- Operating system: Microsoft Windows
- Type: Mail transfer agent
- License: Proprietary
- Website: mailEnable

MailEnable is a Windows-based, commercial email server distributed by MailEnable Pty. Ltd, an Australian-based software company which was established in 2002.

MailEnable's features include support for IMAP, POP3 and SMTP email protocols with SSL/TLS support, list server, anti-virus and anti-spam and webmail functionality. Administration functions can be performed using the Microsoft Management Console (MMC) or a web browser.

Groupware and collaboration functionality are provided by the use of MAPI, CalDAV, CardDAV, SyncML and Exchange ActiveSync protocols.

According to one survey in May 2016, MailEnable has the largest reported install base on the Windows platform, and ranked fourth all in the list of email servers visible on the internet behind exim, Postfix and Sendmail.

== Product editions ==
There are four editions of MailEnable:

- Standard (Free, fully functional, POP and SMTP server which also provides IMAP and webmail)
- Professional (Content filtering and antivirus)
- Enterprise (Collaboration/sharing, database and clustering)
- Enterprise Premium (Mobile web administration and unlimited Outlook Client/MAPI connections)

== Integration ==
=== Control panel support ===
MailEnable Standard Edition is installed by default with Plesk Control Panel.

Other supported control panel software includes Hosting Controller, Ensim and WebsitePanel.

=== Other ===
MailEnable integrates with the following content filtering providers;

- MxScan - anti-spam and anti-virus filtering solution
- MagicSpam - anti-spam solution

== See also ==
- List of mail server software
- Message transfer agent
