= HMailServer =

Open-source e-mail server

hMailServer
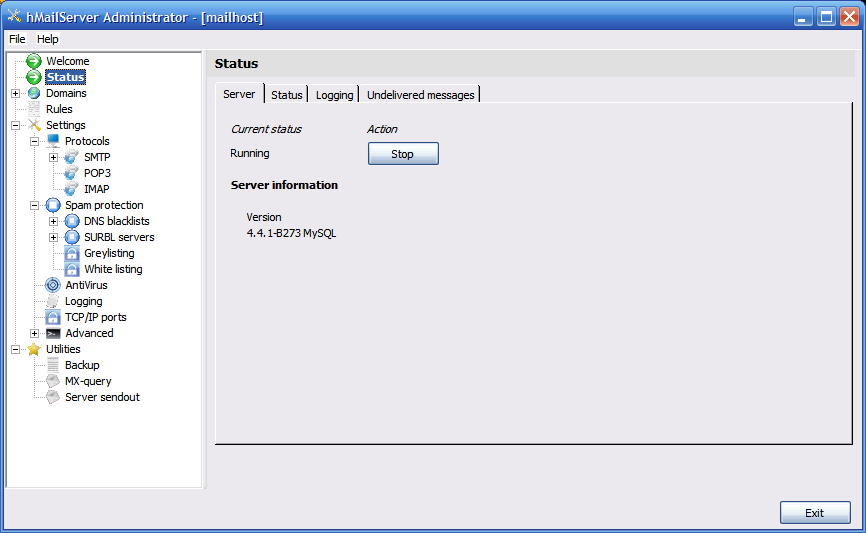
- hMailServer Administrator Screenshot
- Release: 2002; 24 years ago
- Stable release: 5.7.2 (Build 3164) / 13 November 2026; 0 days ago
- Written in: C++, C#
- Operating system: Windows 2000, Windows XP, Windows Server 2003, Windows Vista, Windows Server 2008, Windows Server 2008 R2, Windows 7, Windows Server 2012, Windows Server 2012 R2, Windows 10, Windows Server 2016
- Type: Mail transfer agent
- License: AGPL
- Website: hmailserver.com
- Repository: github.com/hmailserver/hmailserver

hMailServer is a free email server for Windows. It runs as a Windows service and includes administration tools for management and backup. It has support for IMAP, POP3, and SMTP email protocols. It can use external database engines such as MySQL, MS SQL or PostgreSQL, or an internal MS SQL Compact Edition engine to store configuration and index data. The actual email messages are stored on disk in a raw MIME format.

As of 2026, the project is maintained by a small group of volunteers.

Common features such as multiple-domain support, aliases, catch-all and basic mailing lists are present. Users can be authenticated both against the local hMailServer user system and against an external Active Directory.

== AntiSpam ==
hMailServer offers a number of different AntiSpam mechanisms:

- Host based DNS Blacklisting (DNSBL)
- URL based DNS blacklisting (SURBL)
- Greylisting (must retry sending for the message to succeed)
- SPF
- Built in SpamAssassin integration
- DKIM (in version 5.1)

== AntiVirus ==
hMailServer has built in support for ClamWin/ClamAV. It's possible to execute any command line virus scanner.

== Other features ==
- Domain and account signatures (for legal and advertising footers)
- Server side rules (rules for individual accounts available in v5)
- Retrieval of messages from external POP3 accounts
- Quotas on domain, mailbox, and individual message sizes
- Plus addressing (using + to make a virtual alias for an account specific to a task, as seen in Gmail)
- Attachment blocking (based on attachment extension)
- Custom SMTP routes for specific domains (can be used to set up MX backup, forwarding and more)
- API (it's possible to write hMailServer scripts using VBScript and JScript)
- Built-in support for SSL

== Integration ==
- ClamAV anti-virus software
- SquirrelMail for webmail, (requires IIS or Apache); spell-checking available
- Roundcube for webmail, also requires auxiliary database provider such as mySQL to operate
- SpamAssassin spam filtering

== History ==
The hMailServer project was started in 2003. Up until 2008 and version 4, the project was licensed under the GPL. Versions 5.0 to 5.3 were proprietary. Since version 5.4, hMailServer is licensed under the GNU AGPL 3.

== See also ==
- Comparison of mail servers
- List of mail server software
