= Ipswitch IMail Server =

Email server

Ipswitch IMail Server was an email server application with groupware functionality that runs on Microsoft Windows OS. It was developed in 1994 by Ipswitch, Inc., a software company based in Lexington, Massachusetts. IMail was discontinued on November 30, 2024.

== Features ==
Ipswitch IMail Server is a Windows email server that includes the following services: Webmail, SMTP, POP3, IMAP, LDAP, and List Server. Additional features include collaboration for Outlook data, Commtouch anti-spam, anti-virus protection powered by BitDefender, email archiving, instant messaging and solutions for installing IMail on a hosted server. IMail Server licenses are available in packages for 10, 25, 100, 250, 500, 1000, 2500 and unlimited number of users.

== Supported Clients ==
Any standards-based client including Microsoft Outlook, Outlook Express, Mozilla Thunderbird, Eudora,

IMail Server’s web client, and all mobile devices supported by Microsoft Exchange ActiveSync including the iPhone.

== Technical Specs ==
IMail can handle as many as 300,000 users, with an average message flow of ~25 per second / ~2 million a day.

Support for 32 and 64 bit platforms. IIS/.Net Framework 3.5 SMTP, POP3, IMAP4, and LDAP Protocol Support RFC 1870 Compliant

Support for PCI DSS & HIPAA compliance.

== Release history ==
- In 1994, Ipswitch begins selling IMail Server, the first software product available for sale and immediate download via Open Market.
- In 1995, Ipswitch releases family of Windows NT Internet Servers
- In 1996, Ipswitch announces the first self-monitoring email server for Windows
- In 1997, Ipswitch announces IMail Server 4.0 - the first email server to protect users from Spam
- In 1998, Ipswitch's IMail Server is first to bundle Web Messaging and E-Mail-to-Pager with IMail Server version 4.0 for WindowsNT
- In 1999, Ipswitch unveils IMail Server 6.0 for Windows NT
- In 2001, Ipswitch, Inc. Unveils All-In-One Anti-Virus Messaging Solution
- In 2003, Ipswitch announces release of IMail Server 8.0
- In 2003, Ipswitch enters corporate instant messaging market with release of Ipswitch Instant Messenger
- In 2004, Ipswitch expands IMail Server anti-spam offering
- In 2005, Ipswitch launches Ipswitch IMail Server, Secure Edition
- In 2006, Ipswitch announces worldwide availability of IMail Server Plus 2006.1
- In 2007, Ipswitch announces availability of IMail Server 2006.2 with enterprise-level anti-spam and additional anti-virus from BitDefender
- In 2008, Ipswitch Messaging announces release of IMail Server Version 10
- In 2008, Ipswitch Messaging announces two new email archival solutions for IMail Server - MailArchiva Enterprise Edition and Sonian Hosted Archival System
- In 2008, Ipswitch Messaging introduces IMail Server v10.02 with newly integrated Commtouch Anti-Spam and Reputation service
- In 2009, Ipswitch Messaging announces release of IMail Server v11 with mobile synchronization capabilities
- In 2009, Ipswitch Messaging announces release of IMail Server v11.01 featuring DomainKeys and DKIM
- In 2010, Ipswitch Messaging announces release of IMail Server v11.02 featuring new administrator capabilities
- In 2010, Ipswitch Messaging announces release of IMail Server v11.03 featuring availability of Zero Hour Virus Outbreak Protection
- In 2019, Progress Software purchases Ipswitch.
- In 2019, Progress Software releases IMail v12.5.8
- In April 2021, Progress Software announces the discontinuance of the Progress IMail product line
- In June 2022, Progress Software releases IMail v12.6, with a retirement date of Nov 30, 2024
