= CommuniGate Pro =

- Developers: CommuniGate Software Development and Licensing - SA
- Initial release: February 2, 1998; 27 years ago
- Stable release: 8.0.7 - 24 December 2024 / December 24, 2024; 11 months ago
- Operating system: Unix-like, Windows
- Type: Email server, VoIP server, WebRTC server
- License: proprietary
- Website: www.communigate.com

CommuniGate Pro (CGatePro) is a highly scalable carrier grade unified communications server, as well as a development platform. The system is Internet Protocol based. The server is a single process, multi-threaded application written entirely in C++. APIs are available for authentication, helper applications and directory services.

== Features ==
CommuniGate Pro provides web interface (with context-insensitive online help facilities) for configuration of its services. Since version 5 custom procedural CG/PL scripting language is provided for performing advanced configuration tasks, including modification of or integration with software's modules. Perl, Java and command line interface-based application programming interfaces are also available.

CommuniGate Pro integrates with Microsoft Outlook via bundled Messaging Application Programming Interface and ActiveSync connectors. Support for other personal information managers, including Apple Inc.'s iCal, is also available. Communications between connectors and server may be encrypted using Secure Sockets Layer (SSL) or Transport Layer Security (TLS) cryptographic protocols.

=== Email ===
CommuniGate Pro includes mail transfer agent (MTA) protocols that support POP3, IMAP4 and SMTP (along with their secure variations), as well as webmail interface. Apart from standard genre-defined functionality, it is capable of subscribing users to several mailboxes and advanced mail filtering (including calling arbitrary external software, e.g. SpamAssassin for anti-spam protection). Anti-virus protection is available via extra modules, sold separately.

=== Collaboration ===
Since version 5 CommuniGate Pro includes Session Initiation Protocol (SIP) server, which provides instant messaging and voice and video conferencing along with custom Windows Messenger-compatible collaboration-oriented extensions for presence sharing, whiteboarding, and screen and file sharing.

Starting with version 5.1 CommuniGate Pro includes its own XML Interface to Messaging, Scheduling, and Signaling (XIMSS) protocol together with the webmail "Pronto !" client for this protocol. XIMSS offers HTTP- and XML-based client interface to a complex of communications services provided by one server. Although the protocol is not bound to CommuniGate Pro, its scope is derived from the parent project's functionality; so far no other XIMSS servers were announced.

Since version 5.1 Extensible Messaging and Presence Protocol (XMPP) is also supported.

== Distribution model ==
CommuniGate Pro is available as a free download, although after adding more than five users, it adds a one-line banner to the outbound messages. The list of supported platforms include Linux, FreeBSD, Linux, macOS, Solaris, AIX, and Microsoft Windows. Communigate Pro previously supported a wide variety of additional platforms, including OS/400, OpenVMS, Tru64, HP-UX and UnixWare.

Connecters may be installed onto clients directly from deployed server and support automatic update feature.

== Reception ==
In their generally positive reviews, Wendy M. Grossman of ZDNet, Aaron Weiss of ServerWatch and Michael Caton of eWeek praised CommuniGate Pro for its scalability, set of features and high configurability, while criticising it for high price and complexity. Aaron Weiss notes: "CommuniGate Pro is extremely configurable. It wants to be configured. It begs for it. This is a hard-core enterprise server product likely to intimidate point-and-click administrators but happily curl every tech monkey's tail."

== Criminal case ==
The programmer who developed CommuniGate Pro, Vladimir Butenko, died in 2018. Authorship and exclusive rights were registered in the USA, and in 2015 a certificate from Rospatent was added to them. In 2021, his daughter Anna Butenko filed a statement with the prosecutor’s office, accusing the management of the program owner, StalkerSoft, of copyright theft. In 2022, three top managers were indicted. In January 2024, the court stopped hearings on this case and returned it to the prosecutor's office for revision.

== See also ==
- Comparison of mail servers
- Comparison of VoIP software § Server software
- List of mail server software
