= Zentyal =

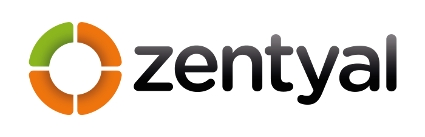

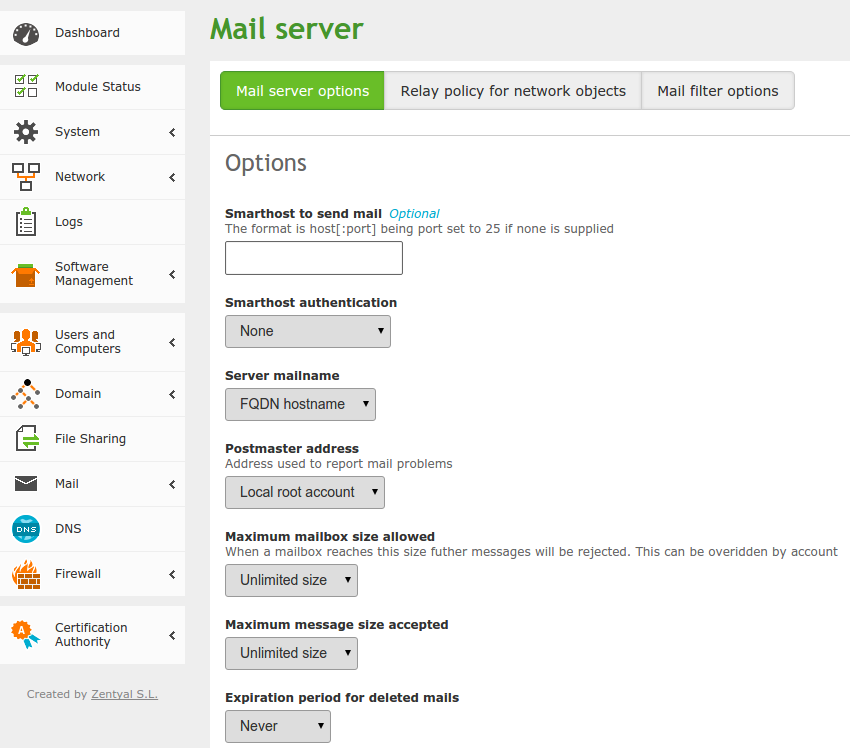
- Zentyal Dashboard
- Developer: Zentyal S.L. (previously eBox Technologies S.L.)
- OS family: Unix-like: Linux
- Working state: Current
- Source model: Open source
- Initial release: July 15, 2009; 17 years ago
- Latest release: 8.0 / 26 February 2024; 2 years ago
- Repository: github.com/zentyal/zentyal
- Available in: English (partially translated in 27 languages)
- Update method: APT (Web front-end available through ebox-software)
- Package manager: dpkg
- Supported platforms: amd64 (x86-64)
- Default user interface: Web user interface
- License: GPL
- Official website: www.zentyal.com

Zentyal (previously known as eBox Platform) is an open source email and groupware solution based on Ubuntu Linux. The latest release (Zentyal Server 8.0 Development) took place on February 26, 2024.

Zentyal implements the Microsoft Exchange Server protocols on top of standard open source components (such as Dovecot, Postfix, Samba, etc.) in order to provide native compatibility with Microsoft Outlook clients. As of release 5, Zentyal has dropped native compatibility with Microsoft Outlook using the MAPI protocol via OpenChange, due to unspecified issues. The OpenChange project was discontinued in December 2015.

The email and groupware protocols supported by Zentyal are ActiveSync, SMTP, POP, IMAP, CalDAV, CardDAV and Active Directory.

Zentyal is distributed in two packages: Zentyal Server for SMBs and Zentyal Cloud for hosting providers. Zentyal Server has a development edition that is freely downloadable and its source code is available under the terms of the GNU General Public License.

== Protocols Plugfest ==
In May 2015, Zentyal organized with Microsoft's sponsorship the first Protocols Plugfest in Europe, aimed at open source communities and technology companies to present, test and discuss technical issues and content around open protocols and interoperability.

== Bankruptcy and trial ==
In 2016 Zentyal S.L. filed for bankruptcy. In 2019 Zentyal CEO, Ignacio Correas, was found guilty of fund embezzlement.

== See also ==
- Cloud Software: Cloud computing
- Windows Server
- List of collaborative software
- List of mail server software
- Comparison of mail servers
