= Haraka =

Haraka or Harakah in Standard Arabic means movement, and the term is found in the name or acronym of many political organizations in North Africa and the Middle East, such as:

- Harakat Hezbollah al-Nujaba: Iraqi Shi'ite paramilitary group
- Harakah (newspaper): newspaper published by Malaysian Islamic Party
- Hamas: acronym for Ḥarakah al-Muqāwamah al-ʾIslāmiyyah (movement of Islamic resistance)
- Harakat 23 Mars: Marxist Leninist movement in Morocco
- Harakat Ansar Iran: Sunni militant organization in Iran
- Harakat al-Shabaab al-Mujahideen: Sunni Islamist military and political organization based in Somalia

In Urdu, the term Harkat has the same usage:

- Harkat-ul-Mujahideen: Islamist Jihadist organization in Pakistan
- Harkat-ul-Jihad al-Islami: Pakistani Islamist extremist terrorist organisation

Haraka may also refer to:

- A type of Arabic diacritics
- Haraka (software), an email server software
- Haraka (hash function), a cryptographic hash function
