= IceWarp =

Czech software company

- Type: Private
- Industry: Computer; Computer software; Information Technology; Communication; Security; Email
- Founded: 2001
- Headquarters: Prague, Czech Republic
- Area served: Worldwide
- Products: IceWarp Mail Server
- Website: www.icewarp.com

IceWarp is a European software company located in Prague, Czech Republic. It develops IceWarp Mail Server, an email, messaging and collaboration service for businesses. IceWarp has offices in the United States, Germany, India, Dubai, and the Czech Republic. The company has been in business since 2001 and is used by over 50,000 businesses around the world. Its product is frequently cited as a European alternative to Exchange Server, Office 365 or Google Workspace.

== Awards ==
IceWarp was named a Red Herring Top 100 North America Technology company in both 2011 and 2012, and additionally received the Red Herring Top 100 Global award.

== Products ==
IceWarp Mail Server is a mail server integrating all communication and collaboration features in one unified application. Available in cloud or for on-premises deployment, IceWarp is a tool to share and exchange all information and ideas online, offline or via mobile devices. It runs on Windows as well as on Linux and current version is 14.3.0. The product was named Merak Mail Server in the past.

IceWarp EPOS is the company's integrated communication and collaboration platform. Its components include:

- Email and calendar – a mail server supporting SMTP, IMAP, and POP3, with shared calendars, contacts, and tasks. Synchronization with Microsoft Outlook is provided via ActiveSync and a dedicated OutlookSync component.
- TeamChat – group messaging with channels, file sharing, and polls. External participants can authenticate via OAuth 2.0 / OpenID Connect using Microsoft, Google, or Apple accounts.
- Conferences – video and audio meetings supporting up to 1,000 participants, screen sharing, session recording, and a webinar mode with streaming to external platforms such as YouTube.
- Documents – a web-based office suite compatible with Microsoft Word, Excel, and PowerPoint formats, based on OnlyOffice technology.
- Files – cloud file storage with sharing, synchronization clients for Windows and macOS, and mobile access.

The platform includes optional integration with OpenAI's ChatGPT for features such as reply suggestions and summarization, enabled by linking a user-provided OpenAI account.

== Compatibility and migration ==
The platform interoperates with Microsoft Outlook, LDAP, and Active Directory, and supports WebDAV, CalDAV, and CardDAV. The company provides migration tooling from Microsoft Exchange, Microsoft 365, and Google Workspace.

== Certifications and compliance ==
IceWarp's products are developed in the European Union. The company lists ISO 9001 and ISO/IEC 27001, 27017 and 27018 certifications, SOC2 compliance, and ISAE 3402 attestation for its services, and states compliance with GDPR requirements.

== History ==
The company was founded in 2001 and its original product Merak Mail Server had been in development since 1998 as a mail server for Windows, later also released for Linux. The product was subsequently renamed IceWarp Mail Server.

During the 2010s, the product expanded beyond email into a broader collaboration platform, adding a browser-based client, mobile applications for iOS and Android, and web-based document editing. In 2015, IceWarp partnered with Collabora to fund and co-develop LibreOffice Online, a browser-based version of the open-source LibreOffice office suite.

In 2017, IceWarp acquired the Mirapoint Email Appliance business from Synchronoss Technologies.

The current product generation is marketed as IceWarp EPOS, which combined the platform's email, chat, conferencing, document, and file components under a single web-based interface.

== Supported control panels ==
- Parallels Plesk
- cPanel
- WHMCS

== See also ==
- Message transfer agent
- IceWarp Mail Server
