= Mirapoint Email Appliance =

Mirapoint Email Appliance was a Unix-like standards-compliant black-box e-mail server, with built-in features such as: anti-spam, anti-virus, webmail, POP, IMAP, calendar and LDAP routing.

System configuration and maintenance is done through a web interface, or through SSH or telnet access to a command line interpreter (CLI). Full access to the Unix-like Messaging Operating System (MOS) is not available. Depending on the model and configuration the appliances can be used as email routers, user mail servers, or as an all-in-one server.

In October 2010, an enterprise messaging company Critical Path and Mirapoint announced their decision to merge with the combined company operating under the name of Critical Path.

== Appliance Generations ==
The first generation of Mirapoint Email Appliances were introduced in December 1998. The two models were the M100 and M1000, both of which were hardware identical. Their differences were in user count, with licensing done in software. Both platforms consisted of a 3U CPU unit, tied to a 3U high RAID array and a 3U rack mounted UPS (uninterruptible power supply). Both of these platforms initially ran Mirapoint MOS version 1.3, the first version of MOS to be released. In the initial release it was not possible to run without the UPS, later releases allowed a no UPS run state, using a license key.

The second generation of Mirapoint products included both email servers and edge mail appliances. The email servers were introduced in August 1999 to replace the low-end M100 and shipped with MOS version 2.0. All the models consisted of 3U appliances with internal RAID storage. This generation featured a UPS built into the CPU head unit. The email server models were numbered SP270 (Service Provider), ES210, ES220 and ES230 (Enterprise Server). The edge mail appliances followed shortly after in December 1999 and were numbered as the MR200 (Mail Router) and the MS200 (Mail Switch).

By late 2000, a minor revision was done to the 200 series, and the email servers were renamed M200 Message Servers, dropping the SP and ES designations. A high-end version of the second generation chassis was introduced, the M2000, replacing the M1000 series. The M2000 followed the M1000 specs, in offering a large external RAID array and external UPS. The new twist was clustered failover, allowing two M2000 heads to connect to a single RAID array with redundant controllers.

== Acquisitions ==
IceWarp Inc. acquired the Mirapoint software business from Synchronoss Technologies, Inc. on 30 January 2017.
