= Mailsite =

MailSite
- Developer: Rockliffe Systems
- Stable release: 10.0 / February 1, 2013
- Operating system: Windows Server
- Type: Mail server, calendar software, contact manager and collaborative software
- License: Trialware
- Website: mailsite.com

MailSite is a commercial mail server, calendar software, contact manager, and collaborative software that was developed by Rockliffe Systems. It was one of the first mail servers to run on Windows NT using Internet standards when version 1.2 was released in 1996 and is currently still in development. It also includes an Exchange ActiveSync (EAS) server for synchronizing mail, calendar and contacts with mobile devices. MailSite also works with Internet Standards-based mail clients such as Mozilla Thunderbird.

== Packages ==
MailSite is sold in three package configurations for different markets. MailSite SE is a single-server package for small and medium enterprises. MailSite LE is a multi-server package for large enterprises. MailSite SP provides advanced multi-server clustering for service providers, hosting companies, internet service providers and telecommunication companies.

== Features ==
MailSite provides the following set of features:

- Mail, calendar and contact server that works with Microsoft Outlook versions 2007 to 2013 without plug-ins
- Exchange ActiveSync (EAS) server for synchronization of mail, calendar and contacts with mobile devices
- Shared calendar server that works with Microsoft Outlook, Google Calendar, Apple iCal and Mozilla Sunbird
- Customizable AJAX Web Client that works with Internet Explorer, Mozilla Firefox, Apple Safari, Google Chrome and Opera
- Mail list server for sending email to lists of addresses
- Built-in two-tier data-less clustering that scales to over a million mailboxes (MailSite SP and MailSite LE only)
- Extensive messaging security including:

- SSL and TLS encrypted connections
- Authenticated SMTP
- Real-time Blacklist lookup (RBL)
- Reverse-DNS lookup (RDNS)
- Directory Harvest Attack Protection (DHAP)
- Compromised Account Detection (CAD)
- DomainKeys Identified Mail (DKIM)

- Optional anti-spam protection including:

- Domain & IP reputation checking
- Greylisting
- White list and black list

- Optional anti-virus protection
- MIME-aware SIEVE content filtering
- Web administration console
- Windows administration console

== Supported clients ==
Groupware

MailSite provides native support for mail, calendar and contact sync for these clients:

- ExpressPro, web-based email utilizing AJAX, which works with

- Internet Explorer
- Mozilla Firefox
- Apple Safari
- Google Chrome

- Microsoft Outlook 2007 to 2013 natively without any plug-ins or connectors
- Apple iPhone
- Apple iPad
- Android Phones and Tablets
- Windows Mobile
- Windows Phone
- Palm Treo
- Symbian with Nokia Mail For Exchange
- BlackBerry OS 5 to 7 with AstraSync
- BlackBerry 10

Mail only

- Microsoft Outlook for Mac 2011
- Apple Mail on Mac OS X
- Mozilla Thunderbird
- Microsoft Outlook Express

== Release history ==
Version	Release date	Changes
1.2.2	November 14, 1996	First high performance SMTP and POP3 email server for Microsoft Windows NT.
2.1.7	October 1, 1999	IMAP4 server; list server; virtual domains; basic spam protection.
3.4.7	July 3, 2000	Microsoft SQL Server and ODBC database integration; mailbox and mail list agents.
4.5.6	June 9, 2001	Multi-server clustering; MailSite Express webmail with multiple languages; MailSite Pocket for WAP wireless email; anti-relay and anti-spam wizards, standards-based SIEVE message filtering.
5.3.11	February 4, 2004	Virus filtering with the F-Secure engine; performance improvements, server roles; improved reliability; improved virus scanning error handling; Active Directory authentication; COM developer API; improved protocol logging.
6.0.11	April 14, 2004	Anti-spam improvements with the Sophos engine; Directory Harvest Attack Protection (DHAP); SIEVE filtering enhancements; mailbox template; improved clustering; improved IMAP4 and anti-virus performance.
6.1.22	June 9, 2005	Secure connections using SSL and TLS; mailbox delivery SIEVE filter, improved anti-virus engine from Kaspersky, performance improvements; anti-spam scoring at the mailbox level; domain forwarding; IP address binding; IMAP4 UIDPLUS, Dynamic Host Configuration Protocol (DHCP) support, performance monitor improvements.
7.0.3	December 14, 2006	Anti-spam improvements with the Mailshell engine; anti-spam integration with SIEVE filters; SMS push wireless email integration; security management: anti-virus integration with SIEVE filters; email traffic counters; performance and reliability.
8.0.5	March 4, 2008	Collaboration; MailSite ExpressPro AJAX webmail client; calendars; contacts; Windows SharePoint Services (WSS) for calendar and contact sync with Outlook; greylisting: configurable outbound IP address and hostname; performance improvements.
9.5.4	July 20, 2011	Exchange ActiveSync (EAS) server for mobile devices; remote wipe mobile devices; listen on multiple ports; exempt friendly hosts from spam scanning, bulk mailbox import and export through WConsole, compromised account detection (CAD); minimum password length; DHAP for POP3 and IMAP4; DomainKeys Identified Mail (DKIM) signing; faster and improved AVG anti-virus engine; anti-spam reputation checking; SIEVE filtering for outbound or relayed messages; anti-spam reputation checking; message store performance improvements; multiple POP3 connections.
10.0.1	January 2, 2013	Exchange ActiveSync improvements for Outlook 2013; IMAP IDLE; Distributed SQL indexes in message store; caches for improved message store performance; per mailbox spool folder; IMAP UID+FLAGS fetch cache for increased performance; logging improvements; faster anti-virus update processing.

== Awards ==
- Windows IT Pro Reader's Choice Awards 2002: Best Mail Server
- Windows IT Pro Reader's Choice Awards 2006: Best Mail Server
