= Axigen =

- Developer(s): Axigen Messaging
- Stable release: Axigen X5 (10.5.0) / June 2023
- Operating system: Linux, Windows, Docker
- Type: Server
- License: Closed source / Demoware / Limited freeware
- Website: https://www.axigen.com/

Axigen is a Linux, Windows, and Docker mail server with groupware and collaboration functionalities. It supports SMTP, IMAP, POP3, and webmail services, and includes features such as an integrated mailing list server, Antivirus and Antispam integration options, and various mobile capabilities including mobile-friendly webmail and Exchange ActiveSync support. Axigen can be hosted in data centers, on bare-metal or Private or Public Clouds of choice.

A free mail server version is available, along with the business mail server and the MSP mail server for Managed Service Providers, including features like a personal organizer and advanced security policies. The carrier-class ISP mail server solution completes the Axigen product range, with clustering support and delegated administration.

The latest version, Axigen 10.5.0, introduces new security tools and the possibility to recall or schedule emails.

== History ==
Development of Axigen Mail Server began in 2003 by GeCAD Technologies, a Romanian company established in 2001 and part of the GECAD Group. It was initially launched in September 2005.

In 2012 the Axigen product and technology were spun-off into a new company called Axigen Messaging, along with the original development team. In January 2014, Axigen Messaging was sold to an investor group affiliated with Romanian I.T. services company Modulo Consulting.
