= Eudora Internet Mail Server =

Eudora Internet Mail Server (EIMS) is a POP3, IMAP, and SMTP server for the classic Mac OS and macOS.

== History ==
In 1993 Glenn Anderson started development on what was then called MailShare, which was available as freeware. In 1995 MailShare was purchased by Apple Computer and renamed to Apple Internet Mail Server. Version 1.0 to 1.2 were released under that name. In 1997 Apple Internet Mail Server was purchased by Qualcomm and renamed to Eudora Internet Mail Server. Version 1.3 was released as freeware by Qualcomm. Versions 2.0 to 3.0 were released by Qualcomm as a commercial product. In 2001 Qualcomm licensed EIMS back to Glenn Anderson, who has released versions 3.1, 3.2 and 3.3. As of April 2024, the latest version is 3.3.10 of 30 Oct 2022, and the payment processor is Kagi that went out of business on 31 July 2016 (making it impossible to buy a licence), suggesting that the project might have become abandoned. The server software also handles the ACAP and LDAP services.

== See also ==
- Eudora (e-mail client)
- List of mail server software
- Comparison of mail servers
