= OSBA =

- Ohio Music Education Association, National Association for Music Education
- Open Source Business Alliance, nonprofit organization
