= IceWarp Mail Server =

- Developer: IceWarp
- Release: 1998 (as Merak Mail Server)
- Stable release: 14.3.0 / September 23, 2026
- Operating system: Windows, Linux
- Type: Mail Server, Groupware, Collaborative software
- License: Proprietary
- Website: https://www.icewarp.com/

IceWarp Mail Server (formerly Merak Mail Server, currently marketed as IceWarp EPOS) is a business Email and Collaboration software developed by the Czech software company IceWarp. The product combines an email server with groupware and team collaboration components, including group chat, video conferencing, web-based document editing, and file storage. It can be deployed as a cloud service, installed on-premises on Windows or Linux, or run in hybrid configurations.

== History ==
The product originated as Merak Mail Server, first released in 1998. It was initially built for Windows and later released for Linux, positioned as an alternative to Microsoft Exchange. It was subsequently renamed IceWarp Mail Server.

In 2009, after Software602 discontinued development of its Groupware Server 6, IceWarp took over its customer base, offering license holders migration to IceWarp Server.

Through the 2010s, the product expanded beyond email: a browser-based client, mobile applications for iOS and Android, and web-based document editing built on LibreOffice Online technology, to which IceWarp contributed as a sponsor and developer. The Documents component is now based on OnlyOffice technology.

The current product generation, EPOS, combined the email server, chat, conferencing, document, and file components into a single web-based environment.

== Components ==
- Email – SMTP, IMAP, and POP3 support with shared calendars, contacts and tasks. Optional anti-spam and antivirus modules. Mobile synchronization via ActiveSync.
- TeamChat – channel-based group messaging with file sharing. External participants can join via OAuth 2.0 / OpenID Connect with Microsoft, Google, or Apple accounts.
- Conferences – video and audio meetings for up to 1,000 participants, with screen sharing, recording, and a webinar mode supporting streaming to external platforms.
- Documents – real-time collaborative editing of text documents, spreadsheets, and presentations, compatible with Microsoft Office formats, based on OnlyOffice technology.
- Files – cloud storage with sharing links, synchronization clients for Windows and macOS, and mobile access.

Optional integration with OpenAI's ChatGPT provides reply suggestions and summarization within email, chat, and document components.

== Compatibility ==
The server interoperates with Microsoft Outlook (via ActiveSync and a dedicated OutlookSync component), directory services (LDAP, Active Directory), and standard protocols including WebDAV, CalDAV, and CardDAV. Migration tooling is provided for Microsoft Exchange, Microsoft 365 and Google Workspace environments. IceWarp solution is available to purchase on numerous Marketplaces such as Hostinger, Vultr, DigitalOcean and SoftwareOne.

== See Also ==
- IceWarp
- Comparison of mail servers
- List of mail server software
