= MeTA1 =

- Developer(s): Claus Aßmann
- Stable release: 1.0.0.0 / May 25, 2014
- Operating system: Cross-platform
- Type: Mail transfer agent
- License: Sendmail License
- Website: www.meta1.org

MeTA1 is a mail transfer agent (MTA) that has been designed with these main topics in minds: security, reliability, efficiency, configurability and extendibility. It supports the Simple Mail Transfer Protocol (SMTP) as specified by RFC 2821 and various extensions.

== New development ==
The next generation of Sendmail was initially called Sendmail X; it was previously called Sendmail 9, but it does not derive from the Sendmail version 8 code base. However, the development of Sendmail X was stopped in favor of a new project called MeTA1.

The first release of Sendmail X smX-0.0.0.0 was made available on October 30, 2005. The final release was smX-1.0.PreAlpha7.0, released on May 20, 2006, under the same license used by Sendmail 8.

MeTA1 1.0.0.0 was released on May 25, 2014.
