= MDaemon =

Email and groupware server software

MDaemon Email Server
- Developers: MDaemon Technologies, formerly Alt-N Technologies
- Release: July 31, 1996; 30 years ago
- Stable release: 26.5.0 / October 20, 2026; 7 days ago
- Operating system: Microsoft Windows
- Platform: x86/x64
- Available in: English, Chinese, French, German, Italian, Japanese, Portuguese, Russian, Spanish
- Type: Collaborative software
- License: Trialware
- Website: www.mdaemon.com

MDaemon Email Server is an email server application with groupware functions for Microsoft Windows, first released by Alt-N Technologies in 1996.

== Features ==
MDaemon supports multiple client-side protocols, including IMAP, POP3, SMTP/MSA, webmail, CalDAV, CardDAV, and optionally ActiveSync for mobile clients and Outlook, and its Connector for Outlook add-on.

In 2002, MDaemon introduced group calendaring and scheduling, along with instant messaging and list server support. By 2008, it became the first Windows-based commercial email server to incorporate DomainKeys Identified Mail (DKIM) to combat spam. In 2011, MDaemon was the first email server to integrate BlackBerry Enterprise Server (BES) for on-premise small and medium-sized businesses. Two years later, in 2013, MDaemon introduced Account Hijack Detection to address email account takeover attempts. In 2023, MDaemon partnered with Spamhaus to protect business email communication.

MDaemon's features include a built-in spam filter with Heuristic and Bayesian analysis, SSL and TLS encryption, client-side and server-side email and attachment encryption, public and shared folder support, mailing list, and support for sharing of groupware data (calendar, contacts, tasks & notes). It is also the basis for MDaemon Tech's Security Gateway for Email Servers.

According to SecuritySpace.com's Mail (MX) Server Survey, MDaemon at its peak provided approximately 2.5% of all known Internet mail servers, the sixth largest installation base from all identified servers.

== Ransomware Attack ==
On October 17, 2022, MDaemon Technologies published on their website customer alert that MDaemon Technologies was the victim of a ransomware cyberattack on Sunday, October 16, 2022. The attack impacted the company's IT systems and website but product itself remained unaffected. As a result, AV update service and license service were not available impacting some MDaemon customers as users reported on MDaemon Facebook page. The AV update and license server was restored on the October 19, 2022. The company was working with the authorities, assessing the impact and working to restore all the affected systems. Their primary goal was to minimize the impact on existing software users. MDaemon Technology employees have had to temporarily switch to manual operations and had to communicate by phone in the U.S. until the systems were up and running.
