= GroupWise =

Messaging and collaborative software platform

OpenText GroupWise

- OpenText GroupWise
- Developer: OpenText
- Stable release: 26.2 / May 22, 2026; 4 months ago
- Operating system: Client platforms: Windows; Server platforms: Linux, Windows
- Type: Messaging; Collaboration
- License: Proprietary
- Website: www.opentext.com/products/groupwise

GroupWise is a messaging and collaboration platform from OpenText that supports email, calendaring, personal information management, instant messaging, and document management. The GroupWise platform consists of desktop client software, which is available for Windows, (formerly Mac OS X, and Linux), and the server software, which is supported on Windows Server and Linux.

The platform also supports WebAccess, its browser-based webmail client. Mobile access to messaging, calendaring, contacts and other data from smartphones and tablet computers is supported (through the GroupWise Mobility Service software) via the Exchange ActiveSync protocol. Enterprise instant messaging and presence is handled by GroupWise Messenger, which integrates with GroupWise.

The product's ownership history includes WordPerfect, Novell and Attachmate; Micro Focus's 2014 acquisition of Attachmate resulted in the product's Micro Focus GroupWise name. Micro Focus was acquired by OpenText in 2023 and the product name was changed to OpenText GroupWise.

The latest generation of the platform is GroupWise 26.2.

== Summary ==
GroupWise operates on a number of server and workstation platforms, including Linux and Windows for the server software (support for NetWare was discontinued in GroupWise 2012). Client software is supported on Windows. A Java client was previously available for macOS and Linux but is now discontinued and no longer supported. GroupWise connectors also exists for Microsoft Outlook (although it is no longer supported) and for Evolution.

GroupWise WebAccess provides users with most of the functionality of the desktop clients from a web browser. WebAccess also supports mobile web access via a user interface tailored specifically for mobile operating systems. GroupWise Mobility Service which was powered by technology from Nokia, was previously used to synchronize mail and other data to mobile devices. A new mobile gateway, Novell Data Synchronizer Mobility Pack, was released with Exchange ActiveSync support in late 2010 to support iPhone, Android, and BlackBerry 10.

The GroupWise Post Office Agent supports IMAP and SOAP access to user mailboxes, in addition to the native client. The GroupWise Internet Agent provides SMTP communication to other email systems, and also supports IMAP, POP3, SOAP, and iCalendar access to user mailboxes and data.

The platform has included instant messaging since the GroupWise 6.5 release, specifically targeted at the corporate market with features such as directory integration and encryption. In addition to the Windows, Linux, and Mac clients provided by Novell, the protocol is supported by Gossip, iChat, and multiprotocol applications such as Kopete, Pidgin, and Adium. There is also a client available for BlackBerry.

GroupWise can export Novell Address Book data.

Licensing for GroupWise includes access to SUSE Linux Enterprise Server, which can be used for running the GroupWise server at no additional cost. OpenText Open Workgroup Suite includes GroupWise.

As of 2026, the latest version of GroupWise is GroupWise 26.2. This release covers Multi-factor authentication enhancements and support for Security information and event management.

== History ==
The product was developed by WordPerfect Corporation in conjunction with some of its largest customers, including the US Department of Justice, as well as with the programming input of some individual system administrators of smaller government agencies, like Eliot Lanes. WordPerfect Library did not include email or calendaring: it consisted of Personal Calendar, Editor, Notebook, Calculator, File Manager and Shell.

- 1987: WordPerfect Library was extended to the PC platform in a DOS version.
- 1988: email and calendaring/scheduling were added; the product was rebranded "WordPerfect Office 2.0".
- 1990: WordPerfect Office 3.0 added support for Macintosh, UNIX and multiple servers with cross-server email, calendaring and scheduling.
- 1992: WordPerfect Office 3.1 added a Windows client and cross-platform for VAX/VMS to the list of DOS, Macintosh and UNIX. Remote capability for asynchronous and wireless connections was introduced.
- 1993: Version 4.0 brought an entirely new interface and transitioning to a database technology for the message store. Other major features included task management, server-based rules, remote replication/synchronization, centralized administration of multiple servers, 32-bit server capability, simultaneous release on all platforms, and many other innovative additions that were firsts in the market. Gateways included SMTP, X.400, fax, pager, and PROFS.

=== Novell ===
WordPerfect was acquired by Novell in 1994, and the server components were ported to the NetWare network operating system. At the same time, WordPerfect Office was renamed GroupWise and integrated with Novell Directory Services (later known as Novell eDirectory). In 1996, Novell sold most of the WordPerfect applications to Corel Corporation, but decided to keep GroupWise.

GroupWise 4.1, the first Novell release, debuted in 1994, adding NLMs (Netware Loadable Modules) and gateways to offer extensive back-end capabilities. Other new features included World Wide Web links in objects, the ability for third-party developers to create and maintain items, tighter Netware integration and management, SNMP capabilities, live maintenance without the need to shut down the server, an integrated listserver, and the ability to access the system remotely via touch-tone telephone.

In 1996, GroupWise WebAccess was released as an add-on, providing Internet-based access to GroupWise from a web browser.

GroupWise 5 in 1996 brought universal management of all types of messages and objects and full collaborative document management. GroupWise Imaging made scanned documents available as well. Integration with Novell Directory Services was also offered. Other notable features included conferencing, a Universal Mailbox, client/server functionality, and shared folders. Some native client platforms were dropped at the time, notably the Macintosh client, preferring instead to offer support via the web-based client.

Version 5.2 added extensive Internet functionality in 1997, including IMAP4, LDAP, POP3, embedded URLs and native TCP/IP. GroupWise Workflow was also added to the product.

GroupWise 5.5 in 1998 enhanced all the basic groupware functions, added full-text indexing, and enhanced support for Internet standards and security.

In 2003, Novell utilized GroupWise Imaging, developed by Computhink, to make available extensive document imaging capabilities directly to the users of GroupWise 6 and 6.5.

With the release of GroupWise 6.5 SP1 in 2004, Linux was added to the list of platforms supported by the server components.

In 2006, GroupWise Mobile Server (based on the Nokia Intellisync software) was released, allowing hand-held devices running multiple platforms to synchronize email, contacts, calendar, and notes with GroupWise.

GroupWise 7 was launched in 2005, providing a totally new Windows client and WebAccess.

GroupWise 8, codenamed Bonsai, was released on November 17, 2008. It added many new features like Calendar Publishing.

Groupwise 8 SP1 was released in August 2009. Groupwise 8 SP2 was released in July 2010.

In September 2010, Novell released the Novell Data Synchronizer Mobility Pack, offering bidirectional data sync between GroupWise and ActiveSync-enabled mobile devices. This product replaced GroupWise Mobile Server and is offered as a free entitlement to GroupWise, Novell Vibe and Novell Open Workgroup Suite customers. Novell Data Synchronizer also synchronizes data between GroupWise and third-party business applications like Vibe, SharePoint, Salesforce.com, SugarCRM and more.

In August 2011, Novell Data Synchronizer Mobility Pack 1.2 released, offering HTML support for Apple devices and increased scalability. Updates to this version of the product between late 2011 and mid-2012 have offered additional performance and quality enhancements and new capabilities such as administrator-controlled device limits.

In January 2012, GroupWise 2012 was released. It offers enhanced mobile support through new Web-based iPad templates and a wholly revamped WebAccess interface, social collaboration capabilities via integrations with Novell Vibe and Skype.

In December 2013, GroupWise Mobility Service 2.0 was released as the next version of, and renamed Data Synchronizer Mobility Pack for mobile device synchronization. New features included full ActiveSync 12.1 protocol support and increased server scalability, expanded device OS support, tasks and phone message support as well as improved address book management. On the administrator side a fully redesigned admin console with improved user/device synchronization status views, a monitoring dashboard, email alert notifications and expanded the user authentication to also include GroupWise as the back end along with the previous LDAP support.

=== Micro Focus GroupWise ===
In April 2014, GroupWise 2014 was released. It offers directory independence (individual accounts can be linked to eDirectory or Active Directory systems, or function without a directory service link, existing only in GroupWise) and a web-based administration interface and REST API which removes the need for ConsoleOne and eDirectory for management purposes. The GroupWise 2014 client features User interface (UI) updates and numerous usability enhancements. The GroupWise 2014 WebAccess client adds auto-refresh and notification of new messages, along with minor UI changes to better match the new look of the desktop client.

=== OpenText GroupWise ===
In October 2023 GroupWise 23.4 was released, fully rebranded to OpenText after the acquisition earlier that year. The version numbering also changed with this release to reflect quarterly releases.

== Versions ==
The following GroupWise versions have been released:

GroupWise version	Latest service pack	Codename	Release date
4.1	SP5	Houston	1994
5.0 AKA XTD		Eclipse	1996
5.0 (slipstream)		Tommy	1996
5.1	SP2a	Black Widow	1997
5.2	SP6 ^{1}	Jolt	1997
5.5	SP5 ^{2}	Surge	1998
5.5 EP	SP5 ^{3}	Aruba	1999
6.0	SP4 ^{4}	Bulletproof	2001
6.5	SP6 Update 2 ^{5}	Hawthorne	2003
6.5.3		Delano	2004
7.0	SP4	Sequoia	2005
8.0	SP3 HP5	Bonsai	2008
2012	SP4	Ascot/Cardiff	2012
2014	2014 R2 HP1	Windermere	2014
2014 R2	SP3	Cornell	2015
18	SP2	Wasatch	2017
18.1	SP1	Traverse	2018
18.2	SP1	Traverse	2019
18.3	SP1		2020
18.4	SP1		2022
18.5			2023
23.4			2023
24.1			2023
24.2			2024
24.3			2024
24.4			2024
25.2			2025
25.4			2025
26.2			2026

== See also ==
- List of collaborative software
