= ZMailer =

- Original author: Rayan S. Zachariassen
- Developer: Matti E. Aarnio
- Initial release: 1988
- Final release: 2.99.57 / June 28, 2007; 18 years ago
- Preview release: 2.99.xx / June 23, 2014; 11 years ago
- Written in: C
- Operating system: Unix-like
- Type: Mail transfer agent
- License: GPL / LGPL / Artistic License
- Website: www.zmailer.org
- Repository: github.com/xosevp/zmailer

ZMailer is a discontinued SMTP mail transfer agent for Linux, BSD and other Unix-like systems.

It is intended for gateways or mail servers or other large site environments that have extreme demands on the abilities of the mailer.

It was first developed in 1988, in reaction to the then existing problems with Sendmail, by Rayan S. Zachariassen at the University of Toronto. The lead developer, since at least 1994, is Matti E. Aarnio.

While official releases have recently been infrequent, regular development and bug-fixes occur in CVS.

ZMailer supports all the modern features expected in a MTA including DNSBL, SPF, and message content scanning.

One site of note utilizing ZMailer was vger.kernel.org, hosting the various Linux kernel mailing lists.
