= Qpopper =

Qpopper was one of the oldest and most popular server implementations of POP3. As a free and open-source server distributed under BSD style license, it was a common choice for Internet service providers, schools, corporations, and other organizations. It was included in several Linux and Unix distributions.

Qpopper is no longer maintained. The final version was 4.1.0 released in 2011.

Qpopper was distributed by Qualcomm as source code; other parties offer pre-compiled or pre-configured versions for various platforms.

Qpopper ran on a wide variety of platforms, including virtually all Unix and Linux distribution, Mac OS X, and even Windows under cygwin.

Qpopper was generally recognized as fast, stable, and secure. It was most commonly used with standard Unix mbox format inboxes (or "spools") but also supported homedir mail. Because mbox is a linear format in which messages are stored sequentially, Qpopper supports a number of optimizations to improve speed and scalability, including a cache file to maintain mailbox state between sessions, and several optional I/O techniques.

== History ==
Qpopper started out as "popper" around 1989 at the University of California, Berkeley. Qualcomm took it over about 1993, and renamed it "Qpopper". Qualcomm's original goal was to promote the availability of correct and modern servers for the Eudora mail client to use, and also to provide a platform for newer extensions.
