= Gordano Messaging Suite =

GMS Mail Server
- Developer(s): GMS (Gordano Ltd.)
- Stable release: 19
- Operating system: Windows, AIX, Linux, Solaris
- Platform: x86, SPARC, RS6000
- Type: Mail server Webmail ActiveSync
- License: Commercial
- Website: www.gordano.com

GMS (GMS) is a commercial mail and groupware server developed by Gordano Ltd. It runs on Windows, Linux, Solaris, and AIX. Originally called NTMail which was the first commercially available mail for the Windows platform, the products were rebranded to the Gordano Messaging Suite in August 2002 to reflect the support for additional hardware platforms and operating systems.

== Features ==
The features of GMS include encrypted access using SSL, anti-virus and anti-spam protection, over-the-air handheld synchronization, web based webmail and calendaring interfaces and a plugin for Microsoft Outlook allowing Microsoft Exchange style functionality.

Administration is performed by a web browser using HTTP

== Supported clients ==
=== Groupware ===
Native support for full groupware features exists for these clients:

- GMS WebMail, which supports Internet Explorer, Firefox and Safari
- Microsoft Outlook by using an Outlook plugin (both online and offline)
- Mobile devices Apple iPhone, Windows Mobile, Palm Treo, Symbian and BlackBerry using over-the-air synchronization
- Windows Calendar on Windows Vista
- Mozilla Sunbird
- Apple iCal

=== Mail only ===
- All standard mail clients IMAP, SMTP, POP3
- GMS WebMail
- GMS WebMail Mobile on mobile devices
- WAP
