= Open Source Business Alliance =

German organization promoting open source software

Open Source Business Alliance - Bundesverband für digitale Souveränität e.V.
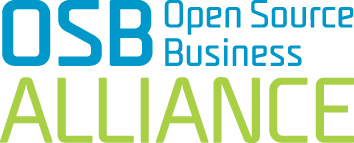
- Founded: 2011
- Purpose: Establish open source as the standard in public procurement and in research and business development. Support of digital sovereignty for citizens, companies and administration
- Location: Berlin (Germany)
- Website: www.osb-alliance.de

The Open Source Business Alliance - Bundesverband für digitale Souveränität e.V. (OSBA) is a German non-profit that operates Europe's biggest network of companies and organizations developing, building and using open source software.

OSBA focusses on German OSS topics and is organized within APELL to work on European level.

== History ==
The alliance was founded in July 2011 in Stuttgart. The two founding associations, Linux Solutions Group e.V. (Lisog) and the LIVE Linux-Verband e.V., officially merged their groups at their annual general meetings on the 20th and 21 July 2011.

The merger aimed to create a unified lobby group for the German open-source movement.

In 2014, a further attempted consolidation failed. The OSB Alliance and the Open Source Business Foundation (OSBF) first announced their intention to merge the two associations to form a single large advocacy group on 18 November 2013. After almost a year of negotiations that only achieved an agreement, the merger collapsed on 15 October 2014.

At their annual general meeting in Berlin in 2018, the association's name change to "Open Source Business Alliance - Federal Association for Digital Sovereignty" was proposed and received broad support from the members present. From the perspective of the association, open source software and open standards are necessary and essential prerequisites for digital sovereignty. The OSB Alliance has established itself as one of the mouthpieces and has been promoting and promoting the topic of "digital sovereignty" for several years. As a nationwide representative of the open source industry and users, the OSB Alliance has now expanded its name in order to make this objective more aware.

== Goals ==
=== General goals ===
The alliance's main aims are to:

- Digital Sovereignty
- Open Source
- Reducing technical lock-ins
- open standards
- Innovation
- Resilience
- Open Collaboration
- Education and enablement
- Sustainability
- Transparency
- Public Money - Public Code

The political ambition is to use 100% of public money on Open Source in 2035.

Central objectives of the alliance:

- The use of open standards with manufacturer-independent, fully published, unlimited specifications
- The abolition of software patents, or alternatively, irrevocable free use of existing software patents
- Inviolability of copyright
- Action by public bodies to enable participation, i.e. open data, open innovation and open access
- Open-minds economy through public forms of cooperation in politics and business
- Net neutrality, i.e. equal treatment of all online data flows

== Board ==
The current board of Open Source Business Alliance e.V. consists of 20 members:

- Peter Ganten, Univention GmbH (Chairman of the Board)
- Lisa Seifert, DMK E-BUSINESS GmbH (Second Vice Chairperson)
- Stefan Zosel, Capgemini Deutschland GmbH (Second Vice Chairperson)
- Diego Calvo de Nó, Proventa AG (Financial Director)

extended board:

- Rico Barth, c.a.p.e. IT GmbH
- Birgit Becker, EGroupware GmbH
- Lothar Becker, .riess applications GmbH
- Holger Dyroff, ownCloud GmbH
- Elmar Geese
- Peer Heinlein, Heinlein Support GmbH
- Felix Kronlage-Dammers, Sustaining Member
- Michael Leibfried, Red Hat GmbH
- Holger Pfister, SUSE Software Solutions Germany GmbH
- Uwe Presler, Bechtle Systemhaus Holding AG

== Working groups and projects ==
The OSB Alliance supports working groups that cover a wide range of issues. As of February 2021 the following working groups were in operation:

WG Cloud
WG Continuous License Compliance
would like to make companies that rely on the "innovation model - open source software" less vulnerable and thus more competitive. The group wants to contribute to efficiently taking into account the aspect of license compliance in medium-sized companies. The “Continuous License Compliance” working group aims to bring routine and continuity to the handling of open source licenses and to promote the automation of open source compliance in cooperation with the community. In addition, the exchange of experiences and best practices should be encouraged and promoted.
WG Education
works on the modern use of digital and interactive teaching and learning material in schools and digital education platforms based on open technologies and standards. In November 2013, the group presented a 30-page document entitled “Digital media, educational platforms and IT infrastructure in schools based on open systems and standards”. The goal is to create an open “education cloud” that is centrally provided but configured locally.
WG Events
decides which events the association attends and arranges its participation. Since 2012, the Working Group Events has organised the OSB Alliance’s Open Source Day, held every autumn. Another of its main focuses is coordinating the appearance of the OSB Alliance at CeBIT, as well as at other events with relevant topics, such as the OPEN-IT SUMMIT or OPEN!2015.
WG Procurement
WG Public Affairs
formulates the positions of the OSB Alliance related to politics and public administration. The group maintains direct and regular contact with politicians, acts as a point of contact for all questions from the public sector and cooperates in European fora. In November 2013, the working group published a brochure on PRISM and its consequences, with tips for countermeasures. Most recently on 21 October 2014, the group held an open IT conference with councillors of the Green Party.
WG Security
Companies and personal members who have special expertise in the field of security have come together in the OSB Alliance to form the Security Working Group. In this way, the exchange of experience among the members can be promoted and analyses and statements on security topics can be developed for the interested public.

== Sovereign Cloud Stack (SCS) ==
In November 2019, Rafael Laguna de la Vera (founding director SPRIND), Peter Ganten (CEO Univention and chairman of the OSB Alliance), Oliver Mauss (CEO PlusServer) and Kurt Garloff came up with the idea of proposing a manufacturer-independent, free, federatable cloud stack for Gaia-X and develop. The idea was given the name Sovereign Cloud Stack (short: SCS) and fell on fertile ground at BMWi and Gaia-X. SCS was integrated as a sub-working group in Gaia-X and further developed by a small team made up of Christian Berendt (CEO OSISM), Dirk Loßack and Kurt Garloff and a growing community. A feasibility study was also carried out on behalf of SPRIND and a funding application for the BMWi was drawn up for the OSB Alliance. On July 13, 2021, the OSB Alliance announced that it receives 14.9M€ funding to coordinate and fund the development of the software and the ecosystem. SCS is affiliated to the Gaia-X Provider Working Group as an (Open) Work Package. SCS uses available open source technologies such as Ceph, Prometheus, OpenStack and Kubernetes and performs the automation, configuration, integration and validation of the components in a standardized and certifiable stack. In addition to the software stack, the project focuses in particular on tools for business automation and the documentation of business processes. With Betacloud and PlusCloud Open the first productive SCS-based public clouds are already available (as of July 2021); further public clouds and implementations as private clouds in industry and public administration are already in progress.

== Lisog open source stack ==
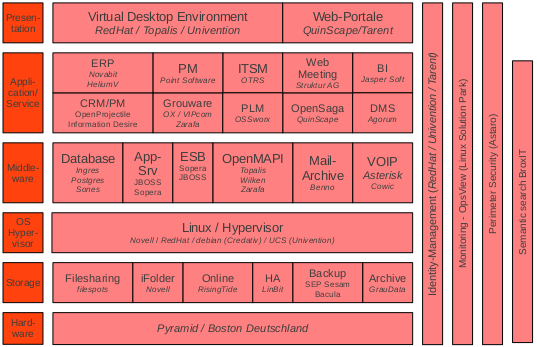

Component	Provider	Description
Virtual Desktop Environment	Red Hat, Topalis, Univention	
Web Portal	Red Hat, tarent, OpenSAGA	
CRM/Project management	Projectile, Information Desire Software	Customer relation management, project, program and portfolio management
ERP	Nuclos (Novabit), HeliumV, Kieselstein ERP	Enterprise Resource Planning
ITSM	OTRS	IT Service management
GW	Open-Xchange, VIPcom, Zarafa	Groupware
PM	Onepoint Project	Project management
PLM	OSSWORX	Product Lifecycle Management
BI	JasperSoft	Business Intelligence
DMS	agorum core	Document management
BPM	SOPERA BPM	BPMN, BPEL, BPEL4PEOPLE, Process server and monitor
Database	EnterpriseDB, Ingres, Postgres, GraphDB	Datenbanken
Application Server	JBoss, Sopera ASF	JEE Application Server, eclipseSOA WebService AppServer
ESB	JBoss, Sopera ASF, Mule	Enterprise Service Bus
Application Integration	Sopera DI	Drag & Drop ETL Data integration components
OpenMAPI	Topalis, Wilken, Zarafa	E-Mail, Groupware
e-mail archive	Benno	SMTP-based e-mail archive
VOIP	Asterisk, Cowic	Voice over IP
Linux/Hypervisor	Novell, Red Hat, Debian (credativ), Univention Corporate Server	operating systems
File sharing	filespots	File sharing and file converter
iFolder	Novell	File sharing in the cloud
Online Storage	RisingTide Systems	iSCSI, FCoE, FC Storage server, based on LIO Target
HA	Pacemaker (LinBit/Red Hat/Novell)	High availability, data mirroring
Backup	SEP Sesam	Backup and recovery
Archiv	Grau Data AG	Longterm archive OPENARCHIVE
Hardware	Pyramid, Boston Deutschland	Hardware for Cloud center and appliances

== Open Source Integration Initiative (OSII) ==
LiSoG initiated a project intended to integrate the single components through a SOA strategy. The project is hosted by MFG in Stuttgart and founded by the German Federal Ministry of Economics and Technology within the Central Innovation Programme SME.

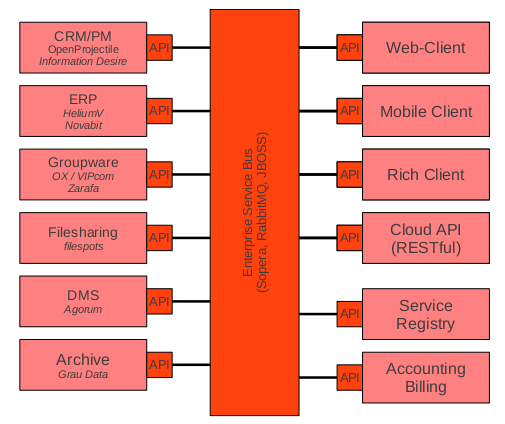
