= Eudora (email client) =

Proprietary email client

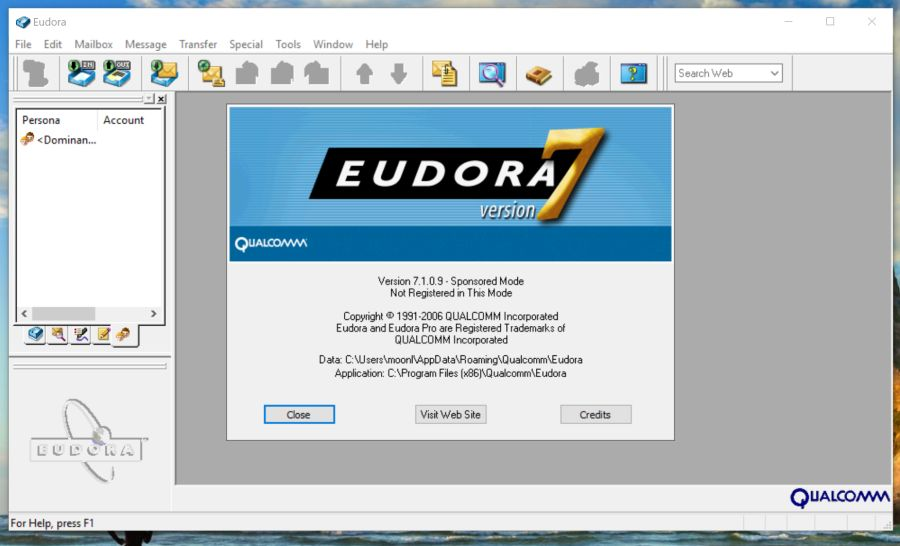
- Eudora 7.1.0.9 (released 2006) in Windows
- Developers: Team HERMES Historically: UIUC; Qualcomm
- Stable release: 8.0 alpha 30c (Windows); 6.2.4 (Mac OS X); 6.1.1 (Mac OS 9) / 2004-05-18 (Mac OS 9); 2006-10-11 (Windows/Mac OS X)
- Preview release: 8.0 alpha 30c (Windows)
- Operating system: Windows, Linux Historically: Classic Mac OS, Mac OS X, Linux
- Type: Email (IMAP and SMTP client)
- License: BSD License; earlier: Free software (Eudora OSE), Adware, payware, Light
- Website: hermes.cx (Eudoramail 8.0) www.computerhistory.org/_static/atchm/the-eudora-email-client-source-code/ (preserved Eudora 7.1)

Eudora (/juːˈdɔːrə/) is a family of email clients that was used on the classic Mac OS, Mac OS X, and Microsoft Windows operating systems. It also supported several palmtop computing platforms, including Newton and the Palm OS.

The final Macintosh and Windows versions of Eudora, released in 2006, were succeeded by the Qualcomm-backed, cross-platform Eudora OSE, built on an unrelated codebase (namely that of Mozilla Thunderbird) with additional extensions. The first and last version of Eudora OSE was released in 2010 to negative reviews and lukewarm support. Development subsequently ceased due to a lack of funding.

The last 'mainline' (pre-OSE) versions of Eudora for Mac and Windows were open-sourced and preserved as an artifact by the Computer History Museum (CHM) in 2018. As part of the preservation, the CHM assumed ownership of the Eudora trademark.

The only actively maintained fork of the software, known as Eudoramail as of June 2024, originates from 'mainline' Eudora for Windows as preserved by the CHM. Hermes, its current maintainers, describe Eudoramail 8.0 as currently being in alpha. Wellington publisher Jack Yan, meanwhile, points out its stability, a number of well-characterized and reproducible display bugs notwithstanding.

== History ==
=== Pre-Qualcomm (1988–1991) ===
Eudora was developed in 1988 by Steve Dorner, who worked at the Computer Services Organization of the University of Illinois at Urbana–Champaign. The software was named after American author Eudora Welty because of her short story "Why I Live at the P.O." Dorner rearranged the title to form the slogan "Bringing the P.O. to Where You Live" for his software. Although he regretted naming it after the still-living author because he thought doing so was "presumptuous", Welty was reportedly "pleased and amused" by Dorner's tribute. This original UIUC incarnation of Eudora was compatible with the Classic Mac OS only.

=== Qualcomm years and first Windows version (1991–2006) ===
Eudora was acquired by Qualcomm in 1991. Qualcomm produced a visually and functionally similar analogue, though the resemblance was merely superficial. Until the birth-cum-death of Eudora OSE, the Mac and Windows programs were developed by different teams at Qualcomm, in different programming languages (C and C++), and had different milestones.

The software was originally distributed free of charge. In response to management pressure, Eudora was later commercialized and offered as a Light (freeware) and Pro (commercial) product. Between 2003 and 2006, the full-featured Pro version was also available as a "Sponsored mode" (adware) distribution.

In 1995, in response to the rise of webmail services, Qualcomm licensed the Eudora trademark to WhoWhere? (later acquired by Lycos). This service operated until 2006, when the eudoramail.com domain ceased accepting new accounts and existing accounts were reintegrated into Lycos Mail. In 2006, Qualcomm also ceased development of the 'mainline' version of Eudora for Windows (in all its forms: adware, freeware, and commercial).

=== Hiatus and source code release (2006–2025) ===
Rather than devote continued resources to the development of a loss leader product, Qualcomm instead sponsored the creation of a new open-source version based on Mozilla Thunderbird, code-named Penelope, later renamed to Eudora OSE. Development of the open-source version stopped in 2010 and was officially deprecated in 2013, with users advised to switch to the current version of Thunderbird.

On May 22, 2018, after five years of discussion with Qualcomm, the Computer History Museum acquired full ownership of the source code, the Eudora trademarks, copyrights, and domain names. The transfer agreement from Qualcomm also allowed the Computer History Museum to publish the source code under the BSD open source license. The Eudora source code distributed by the Computer History Museum is the same except for the addition of the new license, code sanitization of profanity within its comments, and the removal of third-party software whose distribution rights had long expired.

=== Under Hermes ===
==== Pre-production (2018–2019) ====
In August 2018, a "small team" started working on patching the lacunae in the Eudora code, in order to render it usable on modern systems. According to the initial posting on the eudora-win (Note: This mailing list, run by the Clio ListMoms Cartel, is the de facto peer support forum for all versions of Eudora for Windows and Eudoramail.) mailing list, the intent was to decouple entirely from Stingray Desktop, a proprietary library designed for constructing graphical user interfaces under Windows. Originally, Stingray Desktop was known as Objective Toolkit and was developed by Stingray Software (which was acquired on March 3, 1998 by Rogue Wave). As of 2024, it is produced by Perforce. The rationale was that this would allow the mail client (named simply "Hermes Mail" at the time) to be fully open source.

Likewise, Eudora for Windows 7.1.0.9 (the final version released by Qualcomm) leveraged Microsoft Trident as its browser engine (i.e., HTML renderer), a software component deprecated by Microsoft in favor of EdgeHTML as of 2018. EdgeHTML was superseded in turn by Blink. Replacing Trident was part of the project's strategy at the outset and, as of June 2024, remains so (see "Features", infra).

During the time it had been under Qualcomm management, Eudora for Windows had never implemented support for character encoding, and had instead been hardcoded to declare every e-mail message sent as encoded iso-8859-1 (irrespective of the actual content) and to display every incoming message using the system encoding (one of the Windows encodings, depending on the language version of the system). Even before 2006, this created problems for users corresponding in languages other than Western European ones. Later on, as UTF-8 became more and more popular, it became a problem for everyone without exception.

Finally, Eudora 7.1.0.9 and earlier predated the Heartbleed vulnerability and thus refused to negotiate securely using Transport Layer Security with servers that implemented the security patch. They also did not include a modern root certificate store. Therefore, some users had resorted to tunnelling with stunnel as a workaround, while others simply trusted the offending certificates manually.

It was determined that the three former problems had to be remedied in the executable code of the mail client itself, but that the latter could be patched by replacing two dynamic-link libraries and the root-certificate store. Accordingly, pre-production of the mail client (which underwent a rebrand, first from "Hermes Mail" to the project codename "Aurora", and subsequently to "Eudoramail") involved the release of the so-called "HERMES SSL Extensions", also under an open source license.

==== Production (2019–2022) ====
Eudoramail itself began development on 17 June 2019, using Perforce's Stingray user-interface toolkit, "no matter how distasteful we find that to be", a decision the developers felt was justified "given our talents, circumstances and limitations", notwithstanding the estimated outlay (between $2,800 and $3,600). On 31 March 2022, it was announced that "HERMES Mail is on the launchpad and final preparations are made for liftoff", with the initial alpha of Eudoramail 8.0 being released on Aug 1 2022. At the time, the stated policy was that it would be a soft launch, with the release being phased in first for testers, then for users on the eudora-win mailing list on the Clio ListMoms Cartel, and finally for the public at large.

== Features ==
Eudora 6.0.1 added support for Bayesian filtering of spam with a feature called SpamWatch. Eudora 6.2 added a scam watch feature that flagged suspicious links within emails in an attempt to thwart phishing. Eudora 7.0 added Indexed search (powered by X1 Discovery), which found any emails using single or multiple criteria in seconds. Due to lack of legal permissions, this feature was missing in Eudoramail 8.0 (unless a customer already had an existing copy of x1lib.dll, which could be placed into the program directory to restore X1 functionality).

Eudora has support for "stationery", a standard message or reply prepared ahead of time to a common question. Eudora stores emails in a modified mbox format (*.mbx), which uses plain text files instead of a database as Microsoft Outlook does. This allows the user to back up portions of their email correspondence without backing up the entire database.

Eudora supports the POP3, IMAP, and SMTP protocols. Eudora also has support for SSL and, in Windows, S/MIME authentication, allowing users to sign or encrypt email communications for greatest security.

Eudora is noteworthy for its extensive variety of settings to customize its behavior, many of which are not available in the user interface but are accessed using x-eudora-setting URIs that must be pasted into a message and clicked or by editing the eudora.ini text file the program stores settings in.

=== Third-party plugins ===
At least two third-party plugins exist that can convert characters that also exist in iso-8859-1, and it is also possible to run it with "Mime-proxy", but depending on a specific user's needs and due in part to the internal limitations of Eudora, they may only offer a partial solution.

== See also ==
- Comparison of email clients
- Eudora Internet Mail Server
