= Global Address List =

A Global Address List (GAL) is an electronic shared address book which contains usually all people of given organization (company, school etc.). This address book is accessed over the computer network using LDAP protocol, CardDAV or some other electronic means.

The GAL is usually read-only for users. Only administrators add or update the items. Users can search it, look up other people (employees, students, members, etc.) and obtain information such as their email address, phone number, work position and office location.

A common usage of a GAL is if the user is writing an email, and knows the recipient's name but doesn't know their email address. The application, such as an email client (e.g. SOGo, Zimbra or Thunderbird) can look up the email address in the GAL while the user has written only a part of the recipient's name.

== Certificates and encryption ==
LDAP directory can be used also for distribution of user certificates (X.509, OpenPGP). So user can query the GAL not only for contact information but also for digital certificate of other users – in order to send them e.g. encrypted e-mails.
