= SURBL =

Collection of lists of web domains appearing in spam messages

SURBL (stands for Spam URI Realtime Block List) is a collection of URI DNSBL lists of Uniform Resource Identifier (URI) hosts, typically web site domains, that appear in unsolicited messages or other data. SURBL can be used to check data against known misused email addresses, phone numbers, uri shortners and coin hashes via the HASHBL sets. SURBL can be used to search incoming e-mail message bodies for spam payload links to help evaluate whether the messages are unsolicited. For example, if http://www.example.com is listed, then e-mail messages with a message body containing this URI may be classified as unsolicited. URI DNSBLs differ from prior DNSBLs, which commonly list mail sending IP addresses. SURBL is a specific instance of the general URI DNSBL list type.

== Lists ==
ABUSE, PH, MW, CR, CT, DM are gathered into multi.surbl.org.

HASHBL supports the following categories:

- ABUSE
- CRACKED
- MALWARE
- PHISH
- EMAIL
- CRYPTO
- PHONE

== Usage ==
A DNS query of a domain or IP address taken from a URI can be sent in the form of spamdomain.example.multi.surbl.org or 4.3.2.1.multi.surbl.org. The multi DNS zone return records contain codes that indicate which list contains the queried for domain or IP address. Many spam filters support use of SURBL. Small sites can use SURBL through public DNS queries, and an rsync data feed is available to professional users. SURBL data is also available in Response Policy Zone and CSV formats.

SURBL data is also available via API requests and HTTPS streaming feeds. In those cases the data will be sent over web connections instead using unsecured DNS for the transport.

== History ==
SURBL was created in 2004 to replace formatted text-based lists such as sa-blacklist that were previously used in SpamAssassin and distributed through web sites. The announcement of SURBL as a URI DNSBL was made April 8, 2004 to the SpamAssassin user community. SURBL is the first major list of the URI DNSBL type, later followed by uribl.com, IvmURI and Spamhaus DBL.

== See also ==
- DNSBL, a spam prevention method in which e-mail messages are accepted or rejected depending on the IP address of the mail server from which the message is received.
