= Oracle Beehive =

- Developer: Oracle Corp
- Initial release: 2008
- Stable release: 2.0
- Operating system: Cross-platform
- Available in: Multiple languages
- Type: Collaboration platform, Collaborative software, Enterprise social software
- License: Proprietary
- Website: Website

Oracle Beehive is collaboration platform software developed by Oracle Corporation that combines email, team collaboration, instant messaging, and conferencing in a single solution. It can be deployed on-premises as licensed software or subscribed to as software-as-a-service (SaaS).

== Features ==
=== Key components ===
Oracle Beehive includes a platform along with four main components:

- Beehive Platform: unified architecture and data store for collaboration and communication services. Includes restricted-use licenses for Oracle Database and Oracle Fusion Middleware.
- Enterprise Messaging: Email, calendar, address book, and task management accessible via Microsoft Outlook, Zimbra Web Client, and a selection of mobile phones.
- Team Collaboration: team workspaces with document library, team wiki, team calendar, team announcements, RSS and contextual search.
- Synchronous Collaboration: web conferencing and VoIP audio conferencing via the Beehive Conferencing Client.

=== Interoperability ===
Oracle Beehive supports the following standards for greater interoperability and to allow the use of different communication and collaboration clients:

- IMAP and SMTP for email
- Open Mobile Alliance DS and Push-IMAP for email over mobile devices
- CalDAV for calendar scheduling management
- XMPP for instant messaging and presence
- WebDAV for file management
- JSR 170 for accessing content repositories
- BPEL for automating business processes
- LDAP for directory services
- Java Management Extensions (JMX) for system management and monitoring

== Product enhancements ==
In May 2009, Oracle released version 1.5 of Oracle Beehive with new capabilities including web-based team workspaces that include features such as file sharing, team wikis, team calendar, RSS support, and contextual search. Beehive 1.5 also includes added security and recording capabilities for audio and web conferencing and expanded integration with desktop productivity tools like Microsoft Outlook and Windows Explorer.

In February 2010, Oracle released version 2.0 of Oracle Beehive. New capabilities include a software development kit with REST APIs, coexistence support for Lotus Domino email systems, integration with Oracle Universal Content Management and Oracle Information Rights Management software, and team collaboration enhancements including a user directory, discussion forums, task assignments, tagging, and faceted search.

== See also ==
- Oracle Fusion Middleware
- Oracle Database
- List of collaborative software
- Enterprise 2.0
