= Citadel/UX =

Groupware platform

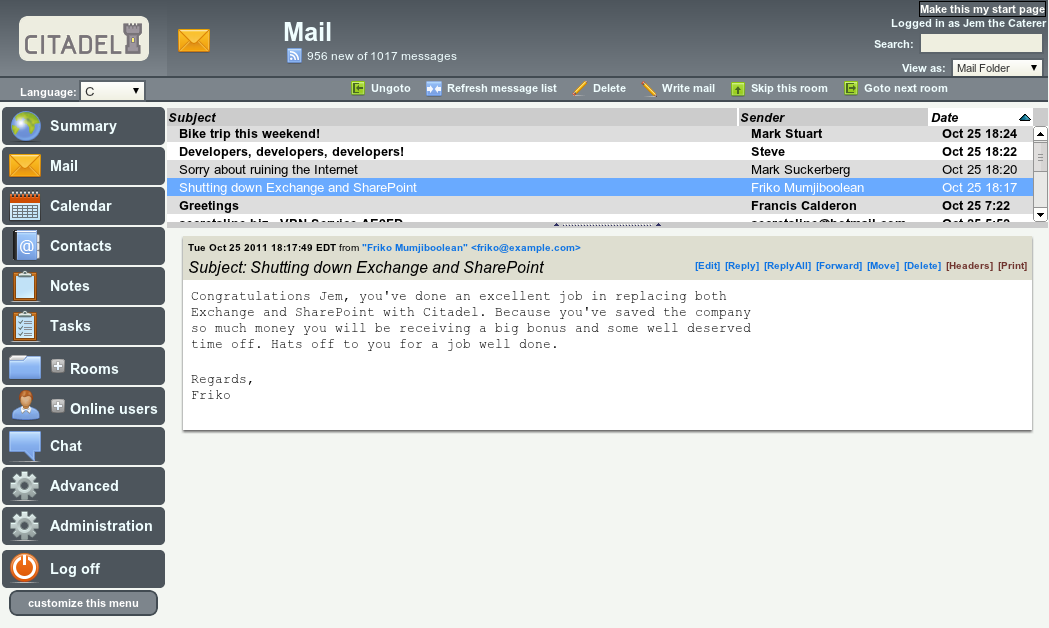
- Screenshot of citadel groupware 2011
- Developer: citadel.org
- Initial release: Before 1988; 38 years ago
- Stable release: 997 / 29 January 2024
- Written in: C
- Operating system: Unix, Linux
- Type: Groupware
- License: 2007: GPL-3.0-only; 2006: GPL-2.0-only; 1998: GPL-2.0-or-later
- Website: citadel.org
- Repository: code.citadel.org

Citadel (originally referred to as "Citadel/UX" to disambiguate it from other implementations) is a collaboration suite (messaging and groupware) that is directly descended from the Citadel family of programs which became popular in the 1980s and 1990s as a bulletin board system platform. It is designed to run on open source operating systems such as Linux or BSD. Although it is being used for many bulletin board systems, in 1998 the developers began to expand its functionality to a general purpose groupware platform.

In order to modernize the Citadel platform for the Internet, the Citadel developers added functionality such as shared calendars, instant messaging, and built-in implementations of Internet protocols such as SMTP, IMAP, Sieve, POP3, GroupDAV and XMPP. All protocols offer OpenSSL encryption for additional security.

Users of Citadel systems also have available to them a web-based user interface which employs Ajax style functionality to allow application-like interaction with the system.

Citadel uses the Berkeley DB database for all of its data stores, including the message base.

Citadel became free and open-source software subject to the terms of the GPL-2.0-or-later license in 1998. In 2006 Citadel was relicensed to the GPL-2.0-only license. In 2007 Citadel was relicensed again to the GPL-3.0-only license.
