= Exchange ActiveSync =

Proprietary protocol

Exchange ActiveSync (commonly known as EAS) is a proprietary protocol by Microsoft, designed for the synchronization of email, contacts, calendar, tasks, and notes from a messaging server to a smartphone or other mobile devices. The protocol also provides mobile device management and policy controls. The protocol is based on XML. The mobile device communicates over HTTP or HTTPS.

== Usage ==
Originally branded as AirSync and only supporting Microsoft Exchange Servers and Pocket PC devices, Microsoft now licenses the technology widely for synchronization between groupware and mobile devices in a number of competing collaboration platforms, including:

- GroupWise with the Novell GroupWise Mobility Services software,
- Lotus Notes with IBM Notes Traveler,
- Mailsite,
- MDaemon Email Server.
- Google in paid Google Apps for Work subscriptions from 2013.

In addition to support on Windows Phone, EAS client support is included on:

- Android,
- iOS,
- BlackBerry 10 smartphones and the BlackBerry PlayBook tablet computer.

Beyond on premises installations of Exchange, the various personal and enterprise hosted services from Microsoft also utilize EAS, including Outlook.com and Office 365. The built-in email application for Windows 8 desktop, Mail app, also supports the protocol.

Apart from the above, EAS client support is not included on:

- macOS, in the native Apple Mail app.

== History ==
=== 1.0 ===
The first version of EAS (called AirSync at the time) was a part of Mobile Information Server (MIS) 2002. This version of EAS communicated over Web-based Distributed Authoring and Versioning (WebDAV) to Exchange 2000 servers syncing Email, contacts, and calendar and allowed users to select a folder list to sync but this was only for email folders (not contacts or calendars). This initial version of EAS has the user's device “pull” data down rather than have the server “push” new information as soon as it was available.

=== 2.0 ===
EAS 2.0 shipped in Exchange Server 2003. This version of the protocol was developed by the Microsoft Windows Mobile team and was delivered as a binary drop (massync.dll) to the Exchange Server team. EAS used WebDAV to connect to a user's mailbox and added the ability to sync non-default calendar and contacts folders. Always Up To Date (AUTD) was implemented as a way to let a device know if there was new information for it and Short Message Service (SMS) was the technology used to deliver this information to the device. Because of the use of SMS as a notification, the configuration of an SMS gateway was required and each account needed to be configured with a user's mobile phone number.

=== 2.1 ===
In Exchange Server 2003 SP1 ghosting support was added to EAS 2.1. Ghosting tells server what they can sync and then all is sent down but when changes are sent up, only specified fields are changed (others are not deleted). The EAS protocol also moved from a Globally Unique Identifier (GUID) to 1:X short IDs for all items which reduced the amount of data sent across the wireless network.

=== 2.5 ===
EAS 2.5 (Part of Exchange Server 2003 SP2) was the first version of EAS to be written by the Exchange Server team. This version also introduced Direct Push, a real-time push e-mail solution which allows the server to say "I have a new item for you" and then tells the client device to do a sync. (This was called a "Ping Sync"). Global Address List (GAL) search was added to enable people to look up other co-workers in their company directory to find their email address. The ability to remotely wipe a device was also added so administrators could remove company data from a device that was lost, stolen, or after an employee left the company. Tasks syncing was added as was S/MIME email encryption and the following policies were added:

- Minimum password length
- Timeout without user input
- Require password
- Require alphanumeric password
- Number of failed attempts
- Policy refresh interval
- Allow non-provisionable device

=== 12.0 ===
EAS 12.0 came with Exchange Server 2007. EAS 12.0 was a complete re-write of the protocol (in managed code) from its previous version. New features included password reset which allowed users to reset a forgotten PIN lock code, message flagging which gave users the ability to mark a message so they could remember to follow up on it when they got back to their computer, Out of Office setting so users could set an “away” message from their phone, SharePoint (and UNC file share) access from links in email (file traffic was proxied though EAS), Empty deleted items to allow people to shrink their mailboxes so they didn't exceed their mailbox size limits, fetch which allowed users to get only parts of a message and then choose later to get the rest of the message (or an attachment) later, device info which allowed users and administrators to see which phones were connected to their accounts, and AutoDiscover which (although strictly speaking isn't part of the EAS protocol) allowed phones to automatically configure the EAS connection with just a user login and password (instead of requiring people to know the computer name of their Exchange Server). The ability to see who was invited to a meeting was also added as well as the ability to search the server for an email that was not synced to the device. The new policies introduced were:

- Allow attachment download
- Maximum attachment size
- Enable password recovery
- Allow simple password
- Password expiration (Days)
- Enforce password history
- Windows file share access
- Windows SharePoint access
- Encrypt storage card

=== 12.1 ===
EAS 12.1 came in Exchange Server 2007 SP1. This version of the protocol was one of the largest changes since version 2.5 and featured header compression (Base64 encoding of a binary structure) to decrease the amount of data sent wirelessly, Multiple collections sync (a bundling of all sync requests together instead of the previous way of doing a sync for each folder separately), a hanging sync which allowed the server to keep a communications channel open to the client at all times so battery life and data wouldn't be consumed constantly turning on the radio and querying the server and was a “true push sync” solution (which had far lower message delivery latencies, as opposed to the previous ping based “push to pull” solution), a confirmation of a completed remote wipe, as well as the following 30 new policies:

- Disable desktop ActiveSync
- Disable removable storage
- Disable camera
- Disable SMS text messaging
- Disable Wi-Fi
- Disable Bluetooth
- Disable IrDA
- Allow internet sharing from device
- Allow desktop sharing from device
- Disable POP3/IMAP4 email
- Allow consumer email
- Allow web browser
- Allow unsigned applications
- Allow unsigned CABs
- Application allow list
- Application block list
- Require signed S/MIME messages
- Require encrypted S/MIME messages
- Require signed S/MIME algorithm
- Require encrypted S/MIME algorithm
- Allow S/MIME encrypted algorithm negotiation
- Allow S/MIME SoftCerts
- Device encryption
- Minimum number of complex characters
- Configure message formats (HTML or plain text)
- Include past email items (duration)
- Email body truncation size
- HTML email body truncation size
- Include past calendar items (duration)
- Require manual sync when roaming

=== 14.0 ===
EAS 14.0 was introduced as part of Exchange Server 2010. This new version added a new conversation view that put email messages in a view connected by several attributes including a Message-ID and the email subject, notes syncing, the ability to look up the availability (free/busy status) of a contact (from their calendar), a Nickname Cache which shared the names of common used contacts between Outlook Web App (OWA) and EAS, the ability to set a server side rule to always move messages in a conversation, lunar calendar support, syncing of the reply state (which let the device and the server know if any message had been forwarded or replied to from any other source), a new way to identify unified messaging (UM) messages so that voicemail that appeared in a user's inbox could be handled differently, SMS Syncing (which allowed users to see their SMS messages in their email inbox and reply to them from their inbox instead of on their phone), and the following two new policies:

- Allow Mobile OTA Update
- Mobile OTA Update Mode

This is also the first version of EAS that identified clients that were using older versions of EAS and alerted them if there was an updated version of the client that would enable newer features.

=== 14.1 ===
EAS 14.1 came as part of Exchange Server 2010 SP1. This version of the protocol added GAL photos (images stored in an Active Directory server of the user who has sent the email), Message Diffs (a means of sending only the new portion of an email and avoiding redundant information), added device/user information to the provision command so that the new Allow/Block/Quarantine feature could more easily allow administrators to control which devices connected to their organizations, and information rights management (IRM) over EAS (a method to apply digital rights management control and encryption to email messages that are sent and received). EAS 14.1 may allow IRM over EAS.

=== 16.0 ===
EAS 16.0 was announced in June 2015 and was deployed in Office 365 first, followed by Exchange Server 2016.

This new protocol version adds mainly 3 enhancements: Redesigned calendar synchronisation to avoid the most common EAS calendar syncing problems, added calendar attachments and syncing the email drafts folder.

=== 16.1 ===
EAS 16.1 was announced in June 2016 and was deployed in Office 365 first, followed by Exchange Server 2016.

This version of the protocol contains three major capabilities: improved keyword search, propose new time and account-only remote wipe.

== Licensing ==
Beginning in the early 2000s, EAS began to be available for licensing. At the time it was a client only protocol license. Motorola was the first licensee and began with a license of the 2.1 version of EAS. Various other organizations licensed EAS over time and Microsoft eventually started licensing the server side of EAS in 2007. The protocol licensing continued until 2008.

In December 2008 Microsoft shifted its licensing of EAS from that of a protocol license, to licensing the patents of EAS and providing full protocol documentation. Because EAS is licensed as a series of patents (and not given as computer code to other companies), different clients and servers implement a subset of the entire features of the protocol and the implementations are written by each company that has obtained a license. Google uses an implementation of EAS for its G Suite subscribers. Likewise, IBM and Novell have implemented the technology to allow their competing groupware servers (Lotus Domino and Novell GroupWise) to support smartphones and other devices, through IBM Notes Traveler and Novell Data Synchronizer Mobility Pack, respectively.

=== Logo program ===
In April 2011, Microsoft launched the EAS logo program, which tests third-party EAS clients in mobile email devices. Handset manufacturers that have licensed the EAS protocol from Microsoft are eligible to join the program. In order to be compliant, EAS clients must employ EAS v14.0 or later and enable the following features and management policies:

- Direct Push email, contacts and calendar
- Accept, decline and tentative accept meetings
- Rich formatted email (HTML)
- Reply/forward state on email
- GAL lookup
- Autodiscover
- Allow-Block-Quarantine strings for device type and device model
- Remote wipe
- Password required
- Minimum password length
- Timeout without user input
- Number of failed attempts

== See also ==
- MAPI/RPC
- SyncML
- Push-IMAP
- CalDAV
- CardDAV
