= CYREN =

American cybersecurity company

Cyren
- Type: Public
- Traded as: Nasdaq: ATDS
- Industry: IT Security; Software; Information Technology
- Founded: 1991; 35 years ago
- Defunct: 2023
- Headquarters: Research Triangle Park, North Carolina, United States
- Key people: Jason Remillard (CEO)
- Products: Web security services

Cyren Inc. was a cloud-based Internet security technology company that provided security services and threat intelligence services to businesses. It offered a range of services including web security, DNS security, anti-spam solutions, phishing detection, ransomware protection, URL filtering, malware detection, and botnet attack prevention. Cyren also provided endpoint protection for mobile devices and Internet of Things (IoT) gateways. Major clients included Microsoft, Google, Check Point, Dell, T-Mobile, and Intel. The company announced its closure in February 2023.

At its peak, Cyren employed approximately 220 with headquarters in McLean, Virginia (US), and offices in Herzliya (Israel), Berlin (Germany), Bracknell (UK) and Reykjavík (Iceland). Its common stock was listed on the NASDAQ Stock Exchange under the ticker symbol CYRN. In January 2019, Cyren announced that it was voluntarily delisting from the Tel Aviv Stock Exchange. In February 2023, the company announced that it had ceased operations and it was delisted from The Nasdaq Stock Market in March 2023.

== Company history ==
Commtouch was incorporated as a private company under the laws of the State of Israel on February 10, 1991, by Gideon Mantel, a former officer in a "special bomb-squad unit" for the Israel Defense Forces (IDF). Wired magazine observed that the early company culture at Commtouch encouraged "being a fighter" as their Israeli employees had completed several years of military service.

The Israeli venture capital company Gemini Israel Ventures which was supported by the "Yozma" government program at the time (doubling any investment with government money, see Yitzhak Rabin) made an investment in Commtouch.

In 1997, Isabel Maxwell became president of Commtouch. According to Maxwell, she convinced Microsoft co-founder Bill Gates to make an investment in the business. In 1999, Microsoft co-founder Paul Allen also made an investment in Commtouch of $20-million.

Commtouch went public in 1999.

In September 2010, the company acquired the Command Antivirus division of Authentium, and in October 2012, completed the acquisition of the antivirus business FRISK Software International.

In November 2012, it completed the acquisition of Eleven GmbH, which enabled the company to accelerate the delivery of private-label cloud-based security services, specifically designed for OEM and service provider markets.

In January 2014, it received shareholder approval to change its name from the original of "Commtouch" to Cyren Ltd.

On February 1, 2023, the company announced that, due to "current market conditions and associated challenges with raising additional capital, the Company approved a plan to reduce its workforce by approximately 121 employees, representing substantially all of the Company's workforce." This news followed the appointment in mid-January of Jeffrey Dauer as the company's Chief Financial Officer and Chief Accounting Officer.

On February 22, 2023, the company announced that it had ceased operations and commenced insolvency proceedings to liquidate its subsidiaries. On March 3, 2023, the company's shares were delisted from The Nasdaq Stock Market. In December 2023, Data443 Risk Mitigation, Inc., a data security and privacy software company, completed the acquisition of certain assets from Cyren Ltd, particularly Cyren's threat intelligence, URL categorization, and email security technologies.

== See also ==
- Web Application Security
- Antivirus software
- Anti-spam techniques
