= Agorum core =

Enterprise content management software

agorum core
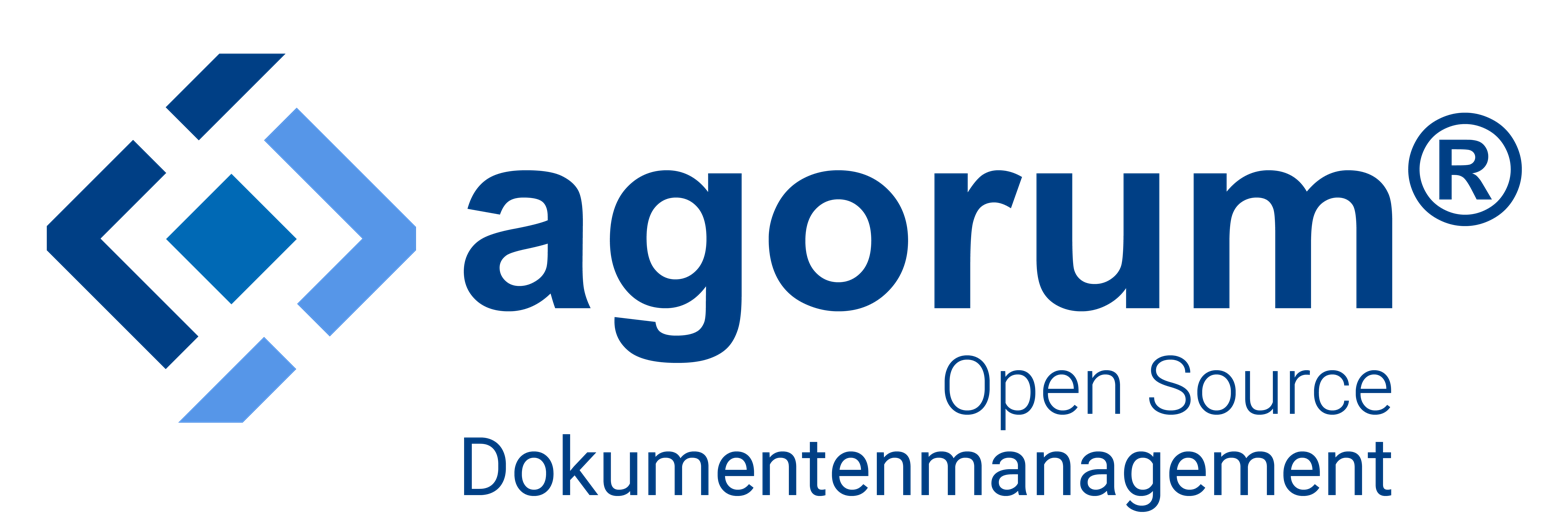
- Developer: agorum Software GmbH
- Release: 2000; 26 years ago
- Stable release: 8.3.0 / June 27, 2018; 8 years ago
- Operating system: Cross-platform
- Available in: English, German
- Type: ECM
- License: Dual licensing: Community Edition is GPL 2, Enterprise Edition is commercial & proprietary
- Website: www.agorum.com

agorum core is a free and open-source Enterprise Content Management system by agorum Software GmbH from Germany. One of the main features is the Document-Network-Share. With that the documents within the ECM are shown as a normal network share. So it is usable like any other fileserver, you can use any program, that is able to access a normal drive (office-programs, scan-programs and so on). From the users' view the benefit is, that everything is working like before.

agorum core is part of the Lisog open source stack initiative.

== History ==
The development of agorum core started in the year 2000. From there it has been redesigned several times to use the latest technologies. Till the end of 2007 the system had been distributed as proprietary software. In the beginning of 2008 the decision was made, to free most parts of the software under GPL. Since the end of 2009 agorum core version 6.4.0 is available. In 2013 at the Stuttgart DMS Expo trade fair, agorum has been awarded the open source "Innovative Project Implementation of the year" in collaboration with Medneo.

== Capabilities ==
agorum core itself is a Java (EJB)-based Software and the server part runs on most common Linux and Windows systems. The Client needs no installation. To access the server many common protocols are supported, like SMB, WebDAV, HTTP/HTTPs for the Webportal, IMAP/SMTP for email programs, RSS-Feeds for notifications. Optional there is a windows client software available, to integrate the ECM into the operating system.

The system also consists of many other open source components. The installation routine offers the choice to directly install MySQL (InnoDB) or PostgreSQL databases.
In the commercial version of 2009 there is a support for MS SQL. The system is based on EJB technology. JBoss is used as the EJB application server. Lucene is used as full text search engine. OpenOffice.org is used to extract the text for the search index. Jasper/iReport is used as an integrated reporting system. There is also an integrated Workflow component, based on jBPM from JBoss.

== Features ==
- Linking documents
- Folder based document structure
- Storing different object types (Documents, Mails, ...)
- Custom metadata/attributes
- Sets (stored searches)
- Automatic document history
- Server cycle bin
- Integrated backup
- Make documents unchangeable (several lock levels)
- Check-In/Check-Out
- Intelligent folders (performing automatic tasks on folders, like archiving, deleting, send to workflow)
- Email integration
- Integrated wiki
- Integrated forum
- TIF / PDF/A support
- Integrated OCR [additional module]
- Notifications
- Notes
- Converting documents into several formats (PDF, HTML, ...)
- Multilingual

=== Protocols/Interfaces ===
- CIFS/SMB
- RSS-Feeds
- SOAP-WebServices
- FTP
- XML
- IMAP4
- SMTP
- HTTP/HTTPS (Webportal)
- WebDAV
- Windows-Client-Integration
- SSL-Encryption

=== Search ===
- Phonetic search
- Wildcard search
- Fulltext search
- Attribut/metadata search
- numeric search
- Combination (Bool'sche)
- Textfilter
- Automatic indexing
- Email indexing, including attachments
- Path based search within fulltext index

=== Administration ===
- ADS (Active Directory service) – synchronisation (additional module)
- LDAP – synchronisation (additional module)
- ACL system
- Users
- Groups
- Reports
- Centralized configuration database

== Integration ==
A major goal of the open-source strategy of agorum core is the integration of other open-source components. The following projects are supported by a plugin:

- Liferay Portal
- SugarCRM
- HeliumV ERP
