= Stunnel =

Free software TLS/SSL tunneling implementation

stunnel
- Developer: Michał Trojnara
- Initial release: 11 February 1998; 28 years ago
- Stable release: 5.74 / 13 December 2024; 15 months ago
- Written in: C
- Operating system: Cross-platform
- Type: Proxy, Encryption
- License: GNU General Public License
- Website: www.stunnel.org
- Repository: www.stunnel.org/downloads.html

Stunnel is an open-source multi-platform application used to provide a universal TLS/SSL tunneling service.

Stunnel is used to provide secure encrypted connections for clients or servers that do not speak TLS or SSL natively. It runs on a variety of operating systems, including most Unix-like operating systems and Windows. Stunnel relies on the OpenSSL library to implement the underlying TLS or SSL protocol.

Stunnel uses public-key cryptography with X.509 digital certificates to secure the SSL connection, and clients can optionally be authenticated via a certificate.

If linked against libwrap, it can be configured to act as a proxy–firewall service as well.

Stunnel is maintained by Polish programmer Michał Trojnara and released under the terms of the GNU General Public License (GPL) with OpenSSL exception.

== Example ==
A stunnel can be used to provide a secure SSL connection to an existing non-SSL-aware SMTP mail server. Assuming the SMTP server expects TCP connections on port 25, the stunnel would be configured to map the SSL port 465 to non-SSL port 25. A mail client connects via SSL to port 465. Network traffic from the client initially passes over SSL to the stunnel application, which transparently encrypts and decrypts traffic and forwards unsecured traffic to port 25 locally. The mail server sees a non-SSL mail client.

The stunnel process could be running on the same or a different server from the unsecured mail application; however, both machines would typically be behind a firewall on a secure internal network (so that an intruder could not make its own unsecured connection directly to port 25).

== See also ==
- Tunneling protocol
