= Qpsmtpd =

SMTP daemon

qpsmtpd
- Developer: Ask Bjørn Hansen
- Stable release: 1.01 / July 13, 2026; 2 months ago
- Written in: Perl
- Operating system: Unix
- Type: open-source, Mail transfer agent
- License: MIT license
- Website: smtpd.develooper.com
- Repository: github.com/smtpd/qpsmtpd

qpsmtpd is an SMTP daemon written in Perl. It was originally designed to be a drop-in replacement for qmail-smtpd, the SMTP component of qmail, and it is now also compatible with Postfix, Exim, sendmail and virtually any software that "speaks SMTP". It has a flexible plugin system, making it easy to interoperate with other pieces in a mail system.

Its main purpose is to allow mail administrators to perform more advanced spam filtering than is possible with other SMTP daemons. As one example of dozens, the earlytalker plugin blocks many viruses and mass mailers based on their characteristic violation of basic protocol, even before they start sending mail data.

The program's main author is Ask Bjørn Hansen. It is licensed under the MIT License.

== Qpsmtpd Plugins ==
A defining virtue of qpsmtpd is its plugin system and collection of plugins. In addition to basic plugins qpsmtpd has a suite of additional plugins that provide integration with external mail filters and processors as well as implementations of many email technologies. The following list is just a few of the many qpsmtpd plugins.

Name	Description
GeoIP	Use GeoIP databases to report geographic information about incoming connections, including distance in km. Assign negative karma from senders that are "too far" away.
p0f	p0f uses TCP fingerprint info to identify the senders Operating System, network distance, and more.
karma	sender history. Treat senders differently based on message heuristics and sending history.
dnsbl	DNS blacklists
earlytalker	Assure the client doesn't talk before we send the SMTP banner
helo	validate the HELO or EHLO message presented by the sender
auth:*	plugins for user authentication include vpopmail, checkpassword, flat_file, and ldap
SPF	Sender Policy Framework
greylisting	temporary deferrals for unknown senders
headers	message header validation
URIBL	scan message content for blacklisted URLs
Domainkeys	validate domainkeys signatures on incoming mail
DKIM	validate DKIM signatures and DKIM sign outgoing messages
DMARC	implements the draft DMARC specification for email authentication
SpamAssassin	the venerable spam detector
dspam	DSPAM is a bayesian anti-spam filter optimized for speed.
AntiVirus	A collection of plugins for AVE, Bitdefender, ClamAV, hbevd, Sophie, and uvscan
FCrDNS	validate sender has FCrDNS configured

== See also ==
- Anti-Spam SMTP Proxy
