= ASRG =

ASRG can stand for:

- Anti-Spam Research Group, a research group within the Internet Research Task Force.
- Advanced Stirling Radioisotope Generator, a type of power system for spacecraft.
