= ASSP =

The acronym ASSP may refer to:

- Application-specific standard product, a type of integrated circuit chip
- The American Society of Safety Professionals (formerly the American Society of Safety Engineers), a professional society for people employed in the occupational health and safety field
- Anti-Spam SMTP Proxy, an anti-spam product
- Anjuman Sipah-e-Sahaba Pakistan, a political movement
- A retired US Navy hull classification symbol: Transport submarine (ASSP)
