= VBR =

VBR may refer to:

== Computing ==
- Variable bitrate, in telecommunications and computing, a non-constant sound or video encoding bitrate
- Volume boot record, in computer disks, a type of boot sector that contains code for bootstrapping programs
- Vouch by Reference, a standard way for email certification providers to vouch for outbound email sent by others

== Other ==
- Reverse breakdown voltage, a diode characteristic in electronics
