= MailerMailer =

Online newsletter service provider for small/medium size businesses

- Industry: Email marketing, email service, software
- Founded: 2001
- Headquarters: Rockville, Maryland
- Key people: Raj Khera (co-founder and CEO); Vivek Khera (co-founder and CTO); Kevin Kamel (VP)
- Products: Email marketing and list management software
- Website: www.mailermailer.com

MailerMailer was an email marketing and newsletter service provider offered primarily to small and medium-sized businesses to create, send, and track email newsletters.

The company claimed over 70,000 customers worldwide and was based in Rockville, Maryland.

The company produced an email marketing trend report that was frequently cited by sources within the industry.

In the first quarter of 2017, j2 Global acquired MailerMailer. No terms were disclosed. It was reported that MailerMailer's sister service, Presstacular.com, was also included as part of the acquisition. In conjunction with the acquisition, MailerMailer was expected to shut down its existing services in late 2017.

== History ==
MailerMailer was part of the holding company Khera Communications, which was founded by brothers Raj and Vivek Khera. Ventures such as the government contractor portal, GovCon and small business portal, MoreBusiness also emerged from Khera Communications.

GovCon.com was started in 1995 and acquired by VerticalNet in 1999. The profits from the acquisition were used to start MailerMailer in February 2001.

== Awards and mentions ==
- 2012, 2011, and 2010 W^{3} Silver Award
- 2012 Communicator Gold Award of Excellence
- 2011 ABA Stevie Awards
