= Spamd (disambiguation) =

spamd is a Unix name for a daemon and may refer to:

- OpenBSD's spamd(8), which are designed to work in conjunction with OpenBSD's Packet Filter on OpenBSD, NetBSD, FreeBSD and DragonFly BSD.
- SpamAssassin mail filtering daemon
