= John R. Levine =

American Internet author and consultant

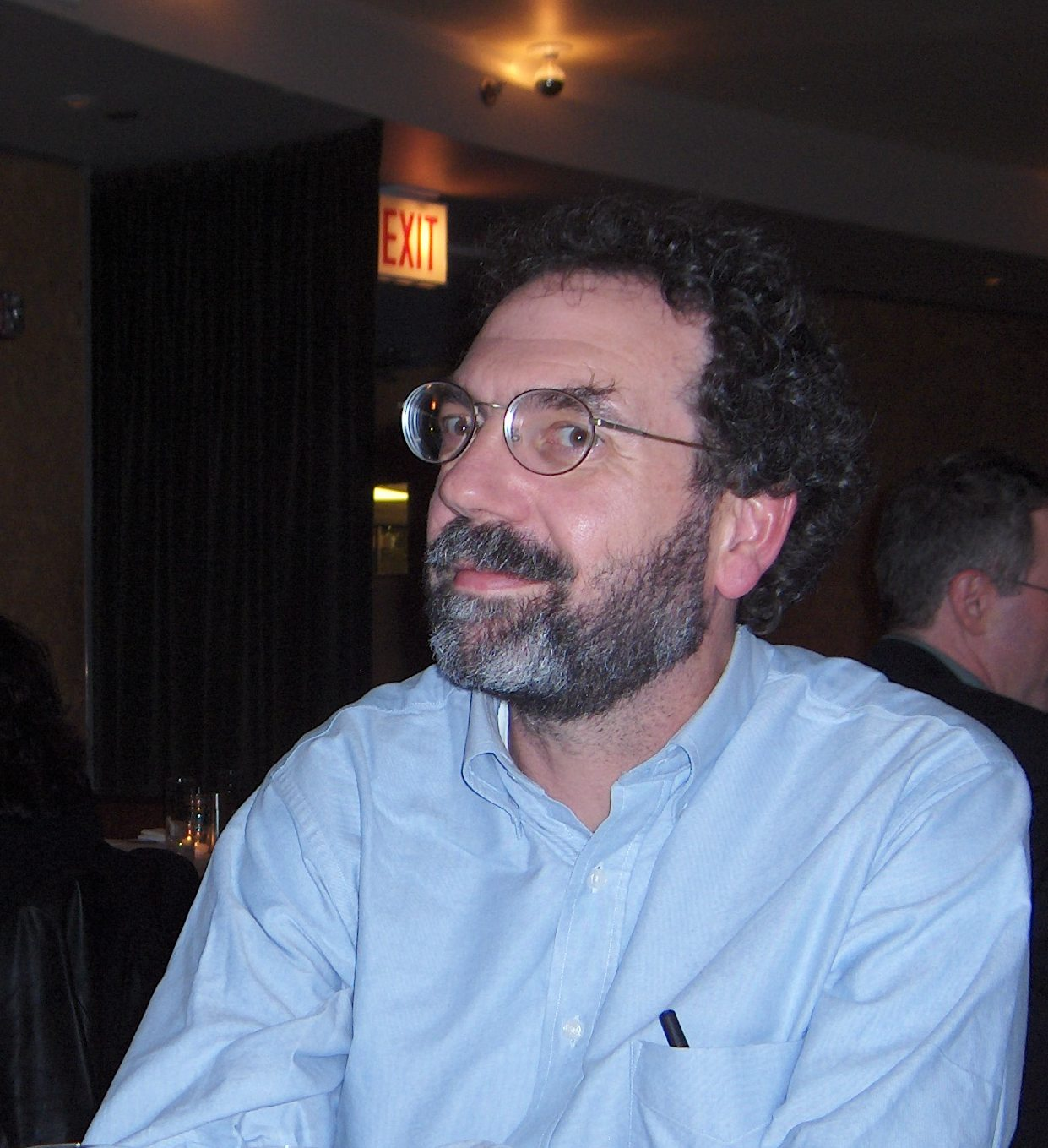
John Levine in 2004

John R. Levine is an Internet author and consultant specializing in email infrastructure, spam filtering, and software patents.

He chaired the Anti-Spam Research Group (ASRG) of the Internet Research Task Force (IRTF), is president of CAUCE (the Coalition Against Unsolicited Commercial Email), is a member of the ICANN (Internet Corporation For Assigned Names and Numbers) Stability and Security Advisory Committee, and runs Taughannock Networks. He has co-authored many books, including The Internet For Dummies (with Carol Baroudi and Margaret Levine Young), UNIX For Dummies (with Margaret Levine Young), Fighting Spam for Dummies (with Margaret Levine Young, Ray Everett-Church), qmail (O'Reilly), and flex & bison (O'Reilly). He was also the mayor of the village of Trumansburg, New York, United States from March 2004 until March 2007.

Levine graduated from Yale University in 1975 and earned his Ph.D. in computer science from Yale in 1984 with a thesis about the design and implementation of small databases. His doctoral advisor was Alan Perlis. His roommate at Yale was economist Paul Krugman. Levine was a co-founder and board member of Segue Software and senior programmer at Javelin Software. He was a member of the R.E.S.I.S.T.O.R.S., one of the first computer clubs in the United States. Levine has moderated the comp.compilers usenet group since its creation in 1986.
