= Barry Leiba =

American computer scientist and software researcher

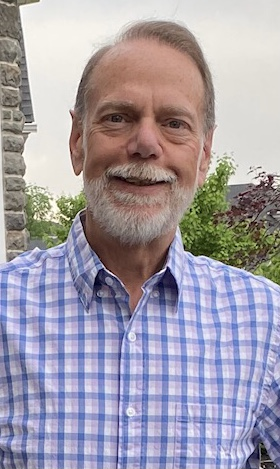
- Born: 1957 (age 68–69)
- Education: University of Florida, George Washington University
- Occupation: Computer Scientist
- Employer: Futurewei Technologies
- Known for: e-mail, Internet standards
- Title: Director, Internet Standards

Barry Leiba (born 1957) is a computer scientist and software researcher. He retired from IBM's Thomas J. Watson Research Center in Hawthorne, New York in February 2009, and now works for FutureWei Technologies as a Director of Internet Standards. His work has focused for many years on electronic mail and anti-spam technology, on mobile computing and the Internet of things, and on Internet standards.

== Work on e-mail and anti-spam technology ==
Leiba's interest in e-mail began in the early 1980s, with IBM's PROFS system, and with a proprietary e-mail system developed for an IBM customer. In the early 1990s he and his team at IBM Research developed an early implementation of an integrated multimedia e-mail system, called Ultimail, which became part of IBM's TCP/IP product for OS/2. The work on Ultimail led to development of the Internet Messaging Framework, a toolkit for developing Internet-standards-compliant clients and servers. He was part of the team that developed the SpamGuru anti-spam engine at IBM Research.

He has published a number of papers at the Collaboration, Electronic messaging, Anti-Abuse and Spam Conference, and was a program chair for the conference in 2008 and 2010.

== Work on Internet standards ==
Leiba has been involved with the Internet Engineering Task Force (IETF) since the mid-1990s, working on e-mail-related standards, including IMAP, ACAP, updates to SMTP and the Internet message format, lemonade, the Sieve e-mail filtering language, internationalization in general and e-mail address internationalization in particular, and DKIM. He has chaired a number of working groups, including DKIM, OAUTH, CBOR, and DMARC, and served on the Internet Architecture Board from 2007 to 2009. He served on the Internet Engineering Steering Group as Applications Area Director from 2012 to 2016 and as Applications and Real-Time (ART) Area Director from 2019 to 2021, and is the IETF liaison to the Messaging, Malware and Mobile Anti-Abuse Working Group (M3AAWG). He was appointed to the ICANN Security and Stability Advisory Committee (SSAC) in 2018.

== Other work ==
Leiba has also worked on IBM Research projects involving context awareness, mobile and distributed computing, and computer security and access controls. He has been on the editorial board of the IEEE Computer Society's Internet Computing magazine since January 2008, where he is currently serving as associate editor-in-chief. In June 2022 he was elected to the Internet Society board of trustees.

== Authored requests For comments (RFCs) ==
- RFC 2177 – IMAP4 Idle Command
- RFC 2683 – IMAP4 Implementation Recommendations
- RFC 5231 – Sieve Extension: Relational Tests
- RFC 5258 – IMAP4 LIST Command Extensions
- RFC 5435 - Sieve Extension: Notifications
- RFC 5436 - Sieve Notification Mechanism: mailto
- RFC 5825 - Displaying Downgraded Messages for Email Address Internationalization
- RFC 6131 - Sieve Vacation Extension: Seconds parameter
- RFC 6132 - Sieve Notification Using Presence Information
- RFC 6133 - Sieve Email Filtering: Use of Presence Information with Auto Responder functionality
- RFC 6134 - Sieve Extension: Externally Stored Lists
- RFC 6154 - IMAP LIST extension for special-use mailboxes
- RFC 6237 - IMAP4 Multimailbox SEARCH Extension
- RFC 6430 - Email Feedback Report Type Value: not-spam
- RFC 6468 - Sieve Notification Mechanism: SIP MESSAGE
- RFC 6474 - vCard Format Extensions : place of birth, place and date of death
- RFC 6558 - Sieve Extension for converting messages before delivery
- RFC 6715 - vCard Format extension: to represent vCard extensions defined by the OMA Converged Address Book group
- RFC 6785 - Support for IMAP Events in Sieve
- RFC 6854 - Update to Internet Message Format to Allow Group Syntax in the "From:" and "Sender:" Header Fields
- RFC 6859 - Update to RFC 3777 to Clarify Nominating Committee Eligibility of IETF Leadership
- RFC 6924 - Registration of Second-Level URN Namespaces under "ietf"
- RFC 7114 - Creation of a Registry for smime-type Parameter Values
- RFC 7377 - IMAP4 Multimailbox SEARCH Extension
- RFC 7803 - Changing the Registration Policy for the NETCONF Capability URNs Registry
- RFC 7957 - DISPATCH-Style Working Groups and the SIP Change Process
- RFC 8067 - Updating when Standards Track Documents may Refer Normatively to Documents at a Lower Level
- RFC 8126 - Guidelines for Writing an IANA Considerations Section in RFCs (BCP 26 edition 3)
- RFC 8174 - Ambiguity of Uppercase vs Lowercase in RFC 2119 Key Words
- RFC 8457 - IMAP "$Important" Keyword and "\Important" Special-Use Attribute
- RFC 8788 - Eligibility for the 2020-2021 Nominating Committee
- RFC 9051 - Internet Message Access Protocol (IMAP) - Version 4rev2
