= Abuse Reporting Format =

Standard spam report format

The Abuse Reporting Format (ARF) also known as the Messaging Abuse Reporting Format (MARF) is a standard format for reporting spam via email.

== History ==
A draft describing a standard format for feedback loop (FBL) reports was posted by Yakov Shafranovich in April 2005 and evolved to the current RFC 5965. AOL, who pioneered the field in 2003, initially used a different format, and converted to this de facto standard in 2008. Feedback loops don't have to use ARF, but most do.

In January 2010, the IETF chartered a new working group working towards the goal of standardizing the ARF. The WG was called Messaging Abuse Reporting Format WG or MARF, which produced RFC 5965. In 2012 it was extended by RFC 6591 and RFC 6692 to define Failure Reports, for reporting email authentication failures. In 2015, the latter report type was further extended by RFC 7489 to define DMARC's Failure Reports.

== Purpose ==
The ARF is designed to be extensible, providing for generic spam reporting, e.g. from users to some anti-spam center or help desk, or for opt-out operations. The format defines a new MIME type to be included in a multipart/report attachment, and includes at least the headers of the offending message. Although the draft description acknowledges that some operators may choose to modify or redact that portion for privacy or legal reasons, it recommends that the entire original email message be attached, including the unmodified recipient address.

An ARF-encapsulated FBL report comes with the same subject as the offending message. Much like bounce messages, an abuse report consists of a human readable part, followed by a machine readable part, and the original message. The machine readable part's type is message/feedback-report, whose definition is the core of the draft. Extensibility is achieved by including a Feedback-Type field that characterizes the report. Possible values of this field are:

abuse
spam or some other kind of email abuse;
fraud
indicates some kind of fraud or phishing activity;
virus
report of a virus found in the originating message;
other
any other feedback that doesn't fit into other types;
not-spam
can be used to report an email message that was mistakenly marked as spam.

An IANA registry is provided for the Feedback-Type, as well as for the other field names. Each field name may either be relevant for any type of feedback, or for a specified type only. Some fields may appear multiple times. For example, the Source-IP field, containing the IP address from which the original message was received, may appear in any type of FBL report, but only once; the Removal-Recipient field, indicating email addresses to be removed, may only appear in opt-out reports, but one or more times. In addition, there is a DKIM-Failure subtype, with its own IANA registry.

An example report for email abuse is as follows. (Note that only the first three lines of the machine readable part are required.)

From: <abusedesk@example.com>
Date: Thu, 8 Mar 2005 17:40:36 EDT
Subject: FW: Earn money
To: <abuse@example.net>
MIME-Version: 1.0
Content-Type: multipart/report; report-type=feedback-report;
     boundary="part1_13d.2e68ed54_boundary"

--part1_13d.2e68ed54_boundary
Content-Type: text/plain; charset="US-ASCII"
Content-Transfer-Encoding: 7bit

This is an email abuse report for an email message received from IP
192.0.2.2 on Thu, 8 Mar 2005 14:00:00 EDT. For more information
about this format please see http://www.mipassoc.org/arf/.

--part1_13d.2e68ed54_boundary
Content-Type: message/feedback-report

Feedback-Type: abuse
User-Agent: SomeGenerator/1.0
Version: 1
Original-Mail-From: <somespammer@example.net>
Original-Rcpt-To: <user@example.com>
Received-Date: Thu, 8 Mar 2005 14:00:00 EDT
Source-IP: 192.0.2.2
Authentication-Results: mail.example.com;
               spf=fail smtp.mail=somespammer@example.com
Reported-Domain: example.net
Reported-Uri: http://example.net/earn_money.html
Reported-Uri: mailto:user@example.com
Removal-Recipient: user@example.com

--part1_13d.2e68ed54_boundary
Content-Type: message/rfc822
Content-Disposition: inline

From: <somespammer@example.net>
Received: from mailserver.example.net (mailserver.example.net
     [192.0.2.2]) by example.com with ESMTP id M63d4137594e46;
     Thu, 8 Mar 2005 14:00:00 -0400
To: <Undisclosed Recipients>
Subject: Earn money
MIME-Version: 1.0
Content-type: text/plain
Message-ID: 8787KJKJ3K4J3K4J3K4J3.mail@example.net
Date: Thu, 2 Sep 2004 12:31:03 -0500

Spam Spam Spam
Spam Spam Spam
Spam Spam Spam
Spam Spam Spam
--part1_13d.2e68ed54_boundary--

== See also ==
- Feedback loop (email)
