= Mail-sink =

Utility program in the Postfix Mail software package

SMTP Mail-Sink Diagram

Smtp-sink is a utility program in the Postfix Mail software package that implements a "black hole" function. It listens on the named host (or address) and port. It accepts Simple Mail Transfer Protocol (SMTP) messages from the network and discards them. The purpose is to support measurement of client performance. It is not SMTP protocol compliant.

Connections can be accepted on IPv4 or IPv6 endpoints, or on UNIX-domain sockets. IPv4 and IPv6 are the default. This program is the complement of the smtp-source(1) program.

== See also ==
- Tarpit (networking)
