= Brand Indicators for Message Identification =

Email verification system

Brand Indicators for Message Identification, or BIMI (/ˈbɪmi/), is a specification allowing for the display of brand logos next to authenticated e-mails.

== Design ==
There are two parts to BIMI: a method for domain owners to publish the location of their indicators, and a means for mail transfer agents (MTAs) to verify the authenticity of the indicator. To implement BIMI, companies need a valid DMARC DNS record with a policy of either quarantine or reject, an exact square logo for the brand in SVG Tiny P/S format, and a DNS TXT record for the domain indicating the URI location of the SVG file. The only supported transport for the SVG URI is HTTPS. The BIMI DNS record is in the following format:

default._bimi   TXT   "v=BIMI1; l=https://example.com/logo.svg; a=https://example.com/image/certificate.pem"

(The a= part is optional. When present, it defines an evidence document; the only current form of this file is called a Verified Mark Certificate (VMC). When absent, the BIMI record is considered self-asserted.) Additionally, services such as Gmail require that a VMC be acquired and presented with the TXT record in order for the brand logo to be displayed in the inbox. These factors alone will not guarantee a BIMI logo will be displayed as heuristics (like spam and spoofing) and reputation will be a key part in BIMI validity.

To query the value of the default._bimi TXT record for a given domain, one can use the dig command-line tool. For example, the following command will query the TXT record for the example.com domain:

dig +short default._bimi.example.com TXT

== Implementations ==
A working group of several companies named "BIMI Group" has formed to develop and support standardization of BIMI in IETF. As of June 2023 the following e-mail services have implemented support for BIMI:

Email clients supporting BIMI
Client	Requires VMC	Notes
AOL Mail	Unknown	
Apple Mail	Yes	
Fastmail	No	
Gmail	Yes	
La Poste	No	Domains without VMCs must be submitted and manually verified by La Poste.
Yahoo! Mail	No	Only for bulk messages from high-reputation domains
Halon	Yes	

== History ==
The BIMI Working Group was founded in 2019 and the first Internet Draft was published in October 2021.

== Benefits ==
BIMI provides several advantages for organizations implementing email authentication:

1. Increased Trust and Brand Recognition – BIMI displays verified brand logos directly in recipients' inboxes, building trust and visibility before an email is opened.
2. Higher Engagement and Deliverability – Recognizable brand logos help improve open rates and click-through rates, while BIMI requires a strong DMARC policy that enhances email authentication and deliverability.
3. Protection Against Phishing and Spoofing – BIMI enforces domain authentication (SPF, DKIM, DMARC) and verified mark certificates (VMC), helping to prevent misuse of brand identity in fraudulent emails.

== Contributors ==
The contributors of BIMI specifications, called the BIMI Group, also called Authindicators Working Group, include:

- Agari
- Comcast
- Google
- LinkedIn
- Return Path from Validity
- Valimail
- Verizon Media (Yahoo)
