= Spamd =

Spam-deferral daemon

spamd is an ISC-licensed lightweight spam-deferral daemon written under the umbrella of the OpenBSD project. spamd works directly with SMTP connections, and supports features such as greylisting, minimising false positives compared to a system that does full-body analysis. spamd is designed to work in conjunction with pf(4), and should be fully functional on any POSIX system where pf is available, i.e. OpenBSD, NetBSD, FreeBSD and DragonFly BSD.

== Uses and features ==
Spamd is most useful in preventing inbound spam from reaching mail servers. It can also be used as a partial application level proxy to ensure that external mail servers connecting to internal mail servers behave legitimately. Additionally, spamd can be very useful in preventing outgoing spam from systems that may be compromised or under the control of spammers.

It can be used to block spammers with the use of the following features:

- Blacklisting: such as the SPEWS database or other lists of IPs, and features including small windows sizes.
- Tarpitting: this can slow down spam reception considerably and hold connections open for a significant amount of time.
- Greylisting: this forces email to be delayed for a configurable period, requiring the remote end to resend mail at least once in order for it to be delivered.
- SpamTrapping / GreyTrapping: this is the seeding of an email address so that spammers can find it, but normal users can not. If the email address is used then the sender must be a spammer and they are black listed.

== See also ==
- Anti-spam techniques
