= Anti-Spam SMTP Proxy =

The Anti-Spam SMTP Proxy (ASSP) is an open-source, Perl-based, platform-independent transparent SMTP proxy server.

== Features ==
Some ASSP's features are:

- Hidden Markov model spam filtering
- Bayesian spam filtering
- whitelisting
- Penalty Box (PB) trapping
- DNSBL/RBL (Realtime Blackhole Listing)
- URIBL (Uniform Resource Identifier Black Listing)
- Multi-level SPF (Sender Policy Framework) validation and blocking
- DKIM signing and validation
- DMARC validation and reporting
- SRS (Sender Rewriting Scheme) fix-up
- Session Delaying/Greylisting and connection response delaying
- Sender validation and recipient validation
- Multi-level attachment blocking (based on block lists or allow lists or content based executable blocking)
- As well as multiple RFC validation mechanisms.
- Multi-threaded (Since version 2.x)
- Platform independent (written in Perl)

== See also ==
- Transparent SMTP proxy
- SpamAssassin, popular open source spam filtering that uses razor and other techniques to detect spam.
- Qpsmtpd, a similar project
