= Point of contact =

Person or department serving as coordinator

A point of contact (POC) or single point of contact (SPOC) is a person or a department serving as the coordinator or focal point of information concerning an activity or program. A POC is used in many cases where information is time-sensitive and accuracy is important. For example, they are used in WHOIS databases.

== See also ==
- Help desk
- Touchpoint
- Liaison officer
- Caret
