= Libipq =

libipq is a development library for iptables userspace packet queuing. Libipq provides an API for communicating with ip_queue.

Libipq has been deprecated in favour of the newer libnetfilter_queue in Linux kernel-2.6.14 onwards.

== Use in widely used software applications ==
libipq has been used by some widely deployed applications as their interface to the Linux kernel-space iptables packet filter.

- Snort - Snort is an Intrusion Detection System which runs in user-space and uses libipq to interface with Linux's iptables packet filter.
