= Email service provider (marketing) =

Company offering email services

An email service provider (ESP) is a company that offers email marketing or email services.

== Services offered ==
An ESP may provide tracking information showing the status of emails sent to each member of an address list. ESPs also often provide the ability to segment an address list into interest groups or categories, allowing the user to send targeted information to people who they believe will value the correspondence.

An ESP will provide a service which may include the following features:

- Ability to create templates for sending to contacts and/or use pre-made templates
- A subscriber list, which is uploaded by the user for distributing messages. This may be enhanced with custom fields in order to hold additional information for each subscriber for filtering and targeted messaging purposes
- A send engine, which allows users to distribute their message to the subscribers
- Updating of the subscriber list to suppress those requesting to be unsubscribed
- Statistical reviews of each email sent to measure the success rate of the campaigns
- Testing of templates for compatibility with email applications
- Spam testing to gauge the score of the email against known factors that will place the template at risk of being blocked
- The ability to send both HTML and plain text formats to improve delivery success rates (known as Multi-Part MIME)
- The ability to customise dynamically the content of emails that are sent out, to tailor personalised and relevant communications

The level of service provided can be according to the above basic features, or the number of subscribers uploaded, or the frequency of use – or any combination of the above criteria.

All ESPs have the same basic features and functionality, however they vary greatly in volumes, policies, and email delivery ability, which makes the selection of an appropriate ESP critical to both the success of an email marketing campaign and the cost effectiveness of its implementation.

ESP's policies, also known as terms and conditions (such as an acceptable use policy), are meant to prevent abuse by users in order to ensure that no spam is sent through their systems. This is intended to result in the best possible delivery rates, with no messages blocked as spam. Some ESPs cooperate with mailbox providers, through organizations such as the Messaging Anti-Abuse Working Group, to ensure compliance with legislation and best practices, and get feedback on the messages they send.

== Misunderstandings ==
According to The Spamhaus Project glossary, mass or bulk mailing is not spam if it is solicited. By accepting a dirty list (a list containing some addresses without the knowledge and agreement of their owners), an ESP puts its reputation in jeopardy, which may affect its ability to deliver messages.

== See also ==
- Email marketing
- Bulk email software
