= Feedback loop (email) =

Process of forwarding user complaints to senders

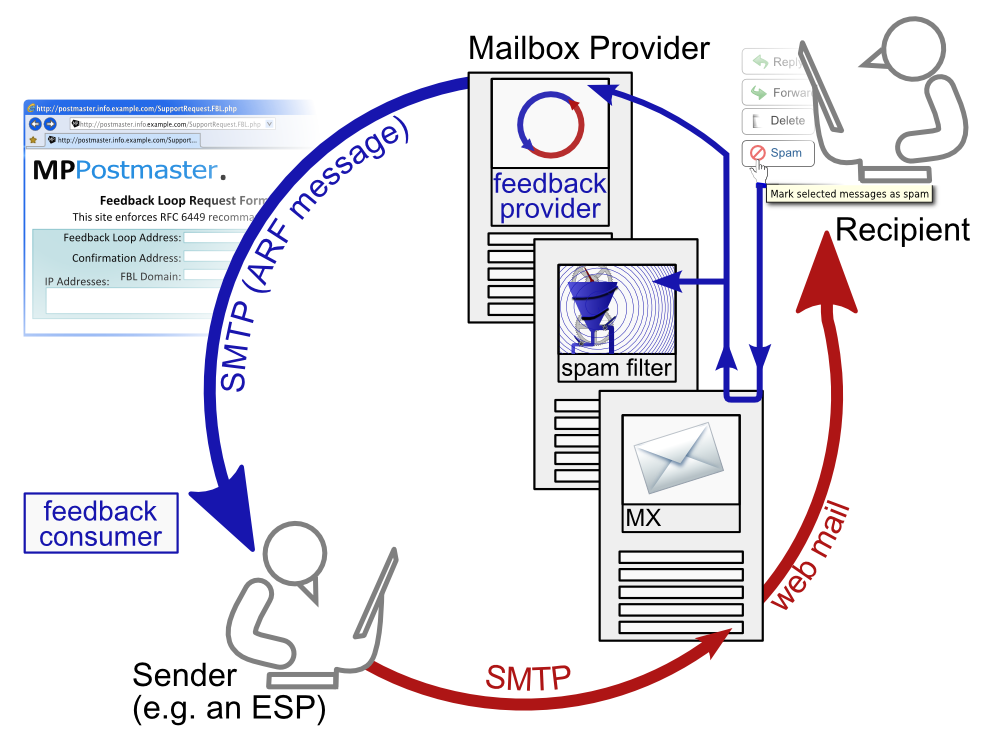
A sender and a recipient connected by a mailbox provider (MP). The feedback provider and the feedback consumer are the two formal endpoints of the feedback loop (blue arrow). Senders need to subscribe, possibly using a web form similar to the one depicted on the upper left corner, in order to become feedback consumers. Recipients typically click a spam button on a web mail page to start the process.

A feedback loop (FBL), sometimes called a complaint feedback loop, is an inter-organizational form of feedback by which a mailbox provider (MP) forwards the complaints originating from their users to the sender's organizations. MPs can receive users' complaints by placing report spam buttons on their webmail pages, or in their email client, or via help desks. The message sender's organization, often an email service provider, has to come to an agreement with each MP from which they want to collect users' complaints.

Feedback loops are one of the ways for reporting spam. Whether and how to provide an FBL is a choice of the MP. End users should report abuse at their mailbox provider's reporting hub, so as to also help filtering. As an alternative, competent users may send abuse complaints directly, acting as mailbox providers themselves.

== Rationale ==
Marketers striving for their mail to be delivered have a twofold advantage: they can remove subscribers that don't want to receive that kind of advertising (listwashing), and they can analyze the complaint rate and hence how their advertising meets market expectations. By unsubscribing users who complain, marketers reduce their overall complaint rate per IP or domain, ensuring that targeted mail is much more likely to reach subscribers who actually want to receive it.

ESPs, when playing the sender's role, are very sensitive to how sending mail on behalf of their customers may affect their reputation. Monitoring the complaint rate is one of the ways they can control what their users are sending.

== Reporting process ==
1. Spencer sends a message to Alice.
2. Alice complains to Isaac (her ISP or MP) about the message, e.g. by hitting the report spam button.
3. Isaac encapsulates the message as either an Abuse Reporting Format MIME part, or (less commonly) a standalone message/rfc822 MIME part, and sends it to Spencer if Spencer has signed up to receive that feedback.

As sketched above, the process implies that Spencer, besides being the author (or sender) of the message, is connected to the postmaster responsible for his mail domain. Subscribing to an FBL usually involves the postmaster's authorization. An FBL subscriber may or may not forward abuse reports to the relevant authors. If no subscribers exist for a given mail domain, Isaac can omit sending an abuse report at all. In fact, subscriptions have to be done one by one, a laborious task that mail domains not engaged in mass mailing may want to skip. RFC 6650 addresses the latter shortcoming by proposing auto-subscribe just-in-time FBLs, which can be started by sending an unsolicited abuse report with further directives (at a minimum, a way to unsubscribe).

Ipsos noted that a majority of respondents to a survey on spam reporting marked messages as spam based solely on the subject and sender data.

For years, end users have been told not to trust email unsubscribe links, so many users hit the spam button as an alternative to unsubscribing. Consequently, report spam may act as unsubscribe in some cases. One of the reasons not to hit unsubscribe links is to avoid confirming that the message had been received and opened.

== Reporting formats ==
The Abuse Reporting Format (ARF) is the standard format for FBL reports. Much like bounce messages, whose design is inherited by ARF, an abuse report consists of a human readable part, followed by a machine readable part, and the original message. The report is characterized by a Feedback-Type field whose values may indicate one of abuse, fraud, virus, or other (more types are registered at IANA).

Microsoft, who use the name Junk Mail Reporting (JMR), also use their own format.

Google's Gmail is beta testing a non-traditional FBL with select ESPs. Gmail uses their own format—an aggregate report that reveals spam rate per notable sender. SendGrid reports that the Gmail FBL, developed and launched by Julian Tempelsman and Sri Somanchi, is effective at identifying spam that other anti-spam systems miss.

== See also ==
- Abuse Reporting Format
- Spam reporting
