= Anti-Spam Research Group =

The Anti-Spam Research Group (ASRG) was a research group started within the Internet Research Task Force (IRTF), where its charter concluded on 18 March 2013. It is still a reference and a melting pot for anti-spam research and theorization. In particular, the wiki lives on.

Dedicated to research into curbing spam on an Internet-wide level, it consists of a mailing list to coordinate work and a small web site with a wiki.

As with other IRTF groups, the ASRG contributed to the Internet Engineering Task Force (IETF) process with drafts, documents, and assistance in the creation of new working groups. One IETF group spun off from the ASRG is MARID.

The ASRG is sporadically active, as little evolves in the anti-spam landscape, with most activity happening on the mailing list. In 2008 the ASRG worked on Internet Drafts about DNSBLs, in 2010 on the standardization of Feedback loop (email).

== Chairs of the ASRG ==
- John R. Levine of Taughannock Networks (2003–2013)
- Yakov Shafranovich of SolidMatrix Technologies (2003 - 2004)
- Paul Q. Judge of Ciphertrust, Inc. (2003)
