= MailScanner =

- Developer: Shawn Iverson
- Stable release: 5.3.4 / 4 December 2020
- Repository: github.com/MailScanner/v5
- Operating system: Cross-platform
- Type: Email filtering
- License: GPL
- Website: www.mailscanner.info

MailScanner is an open source email security system for use on Unix email gateways and was first released in 2001. It protects against viruses, spam, malware, and phishing. It is distributed under the GNU General Public License.

The original author, Julian Field, won the 2004 Open Source Award from UKUUG for the product.

Worldwide, the software is estimated to be process over eighty billion emails per month, with millions of downloads. Internet service providers and mobile telephone networks are included in this list of users.

More recently, anti-phishing measures have been introduced. The software spots attempts at obfuscating URLs (for example, to lure the user into thinking they are signing into their bank, when in reality they are using an impostor web site) and modifies the email with a suitable warning.

As of January 2014 the project is sponsored by the lead developer Jerry Benton who is the founder of Mailborder Systems. As of January 2018 the primary developer is Shawn Iverson of the eFa Project. The project's other major contributor is Mark Sapiro of the GNU Mailman project.

== Technology ==
MailScanner is implemented in around 50,000 lines of Perl. It links with other software packages in order to fulfill its duties:

- Email server (MTA) (e.g. sendmail, postfix).
- Anti-virus software (e.g. ClamAV – over twenty five different products are supported).
- Anti-spam software (SpamAssassin).

As with any complex software platform, performance results can vary wildly depending on a wide variety of factors. In 2009 evidence suggested that a quad Xeon PC with 2 GB of RAM and 15 kRPM SCSI disks can process something in the area of 2.2 million messages per day. This number would be dwarfed by modern hardware.
