= Email hub =

The term Mail Hub is used to denote an MTA (message transfer agent) or system of MTAs used to route email but not act as a mail server (having no end-user email store) since there is no MUA (mail user agent) access. Examples could include dedicated anti-SPAM appliances, anti-virus engines running on dedicated hardware, email gateways and so forth.

== DNS Based Mail Hub ==
A first example for a Mail Hub consisting of a network of MTAs would be that of a typical small-to-medium size Internet service provider (ISP), or for a FOSS corporate mail system. This solution is very good for developing nation ISPs and NGOs. As well as any other low-budget but high availability mail system needs. This is mostly due to not using expensive Network level switches and hardware.

Simple DNS MX record based Mail Hub cluster with parallelism and front-end failover and load balancing is illustrated in the following diagram:

The servers would be all Linux x86 servers with low cost SATA or PATA hard disk storage. The front-end servers would most likely run Postfix with Spamassassin and ClamAV. This RAIS server Cluster would then overcome the problem with Perl based Spamassassin being too CPU and memory hungry for low cost servers. The solution presented here is based on all GPL FOSS free software, but of course there are alternative configurations using other free or non-free software.
