= Milter (disambiguation) =

Milter is the portmanteau for mail filter, an extension to the widely used open source mail transfer agents (MTA) Sendmail and Postfix.

Milter may also refer to:

- Steven Milter, a major character in the Ally McBeal television series
- A male fish capable of producing milt during breeding season
