= Postfix =

Postfix may refer to:

- Postfix (linguistics), an affix which is placed after the stem of a word
- Postfix notation, a way of writing algebraic and other expressions
- Postfix (software), a mail transfer agent
