= ClamWin Free Antivirus =

Computer antivirus software

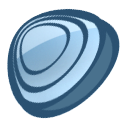

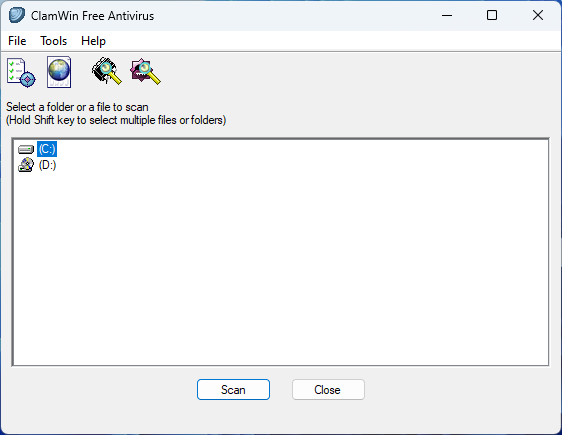
- ClamWin running on Windows 11
- Developer: ClamWin Pty Ltd
- Stable release: 0.103.2.1 / June 7, 2021; 4 years ago
- Written in: C++ and Python
- Operating system: Windows 98 and newer
- Type: Antivirus software
- License: GPL-2.0-or-later
- Website: clamwin.com
- Repository: github.com/clamwin/clamwin/

ClamWin Free Antivirus is a free and open-source antivirus tool for Windows. It provides a graphical user interface to the Clam AntiVirus engine.

== Features ==
- Scanning scheduler (only effective with user logged in).
- Automatic virus database updates on a regular basis.
- Standalone virus-scanner.
- Context menu integration for Windows Explorer.
- Add-in for Microsoft Outlook.
- A portable version that can be used from a USB flash drive.

There are Firefox extensions that allow the users to process downloaded files with ClamWin.

=== No real-time scanning ===
ClamWin Free Antivirus scans on demand; it does not automatically scan files as they are read and written.

The non-affiliated projects Clam Sentinel and Winpooch are add-ons that provide a real-time scanning capability to ClamWin.

== See also ==
- List of free and open-source software packages
- ClamTk, a similar interface for ClamAV, but for Linux desktop use.
