= ClamTk =

Computer antivirus software for Linux

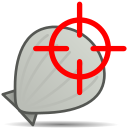

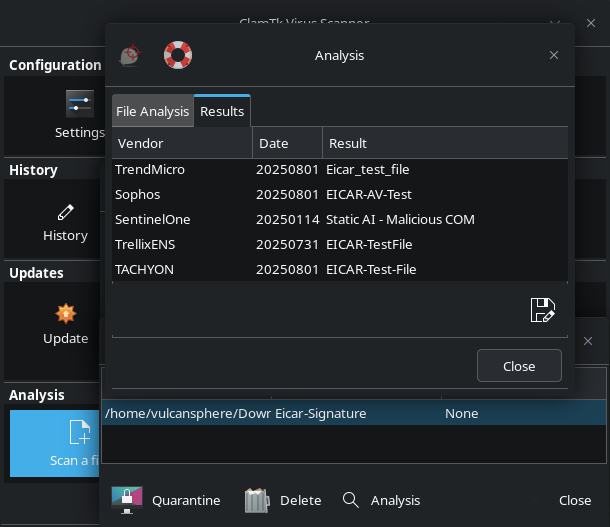
- ClamTk 6.18 running on openSUSE
- Original author: Dave Mauroni
- Developer: Dave Mauroni
- Release: February 2004; 22 years ago
- Final release: 6.18 / 27 January 2024; 2 years ago
- Written in: Perl
- Operating system: Linux
- Type: Antivirus software
- License: GNU General Public License/Artistic License
- Website: gitlab.com/dave_m/clamtk/
- Repository: github.com/dave-theunsub/clamtk

ClamTk is a free and open-source graphical interface for the ClamAV command-line antivirus software program for Linux desktop users. It provides both on-demand and scheduled scanning. The project was started by Dave Mauroni in February 2004. As of April 2024, the program is no longer maintained.

ClamTk was originally written using the Tk widget toolkit, for which it is named, but it was later re-written in Perl, using the GTK toolkit. The interface has evolved considerably over time and recent versions are quite different than early releases, adding features and changing the interface presentation. It is dual-licensed under the GNU General Public License version 1 or later, and the Artistic License.

== Features ==
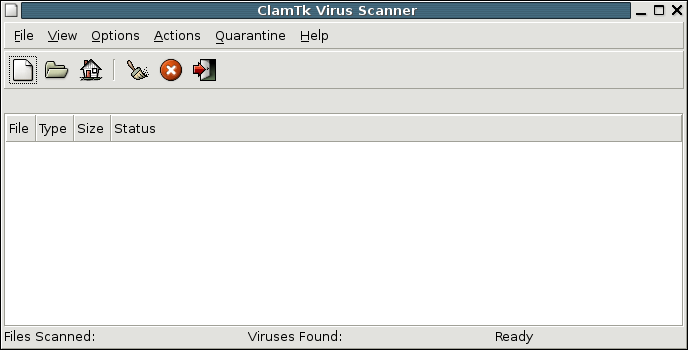
Early release of ClamTk from 2005

The ClamTk interface allows scanning of single files or directories. It can be configured for recursive scans, scanning all sub-directories, for whitelists, to scan for potentially unwanted applications (PUAs), to exclude hidden files, or large files over 20 MB. In 2017 GHacks reviewer Mike Turcotte-McCusker noted the high rate of false positives that the PUA-inclusive scans return.

The history selection allows reviewing the results of previous scans and quarantined files. ClamTk allows manual or automatic updates to be configured for ClamAV's virus definitions.

The application interfaces with thunar-sendto-clamtk, nemo-sendto-clamtk, clamtk-gnome and clamtk-kde, each of which provide context menu functionality for the associated file managers, Thunar, Nemo, GNOME Files and Dolphin, allowing users to directly send files to ClamTk for scanning.

ClamTk can also be run from the command-line interface, although the main reason that command line access exists was for interface with the various file managers.

== Use ==
ClamTk is included in the repositories of many Linux distributions, including ALT Linux, Arch Linux, CentOS, Debian, Fedora, Gentoo, Linux Mint, Mandriva, openSUSE, PCLinuxOS, Red Hat Enterprise Linux, Ubuntu, as well as FreeBSD.

Most users install ClamTk from the repositories of the Linux distribution that they are using, but the application's website, also provided downloads for the latest release versions, in the form of .rpm and .deb files.

== Reception ==
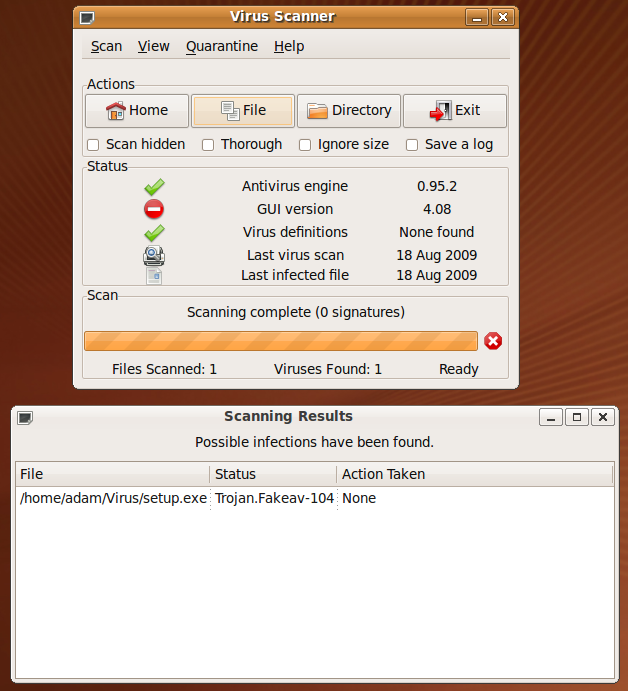
ClamTk 4.08 running on Ubuntu 9.04

A 2014 review of ClamTk 5.0.7 by Silviu Stahie of Softpedia recommended the application as a means of getting ClamAV functionality in an easy-to-use graphical interface. He wrote, "basically, all functions of ClamTK can be performed in a terminal with ClamAV. That would be fine if you had no desktop environment, like on a server, but there is no reason to use the terminal in a regular Linux distribution."

A 2015 review by Bill Toulas on the How To Forge noted that ClamTk seemed to take a comparable amount of time to scan compared to ClamAV, indicating that it wasn't slowing the scanning engine down.

A 2017 review in Linux and Ubuntu said, "ClamTK provides a very simple GUI that allows beginners who are not most comfortable to use CLI. Upon launching ClamTk, you will be presented with a clean GUI with 4 main sections."

In Ubuntu Pit's listing of the Best Linux Antivirus: Top 10 Reviewed and Compared, ClamTk was recommended for average users and described as "lightweight".

A 2019 review in Make Tech Easier included ClamTk in its review of The Best Antivirus Programs for Ubuntu. They reported, "If you need a good virus scanner, and you’re not a fan of the command line, ClamTk is the best choice."

A review by Derrik Diener of Additive Tips in 2019 stated, "... if you like the features of the ClamAV tool, but dislike dealing with the command-line, you’ll get the same useful features in a nice, easy-to-use interface ... ClamTK takes all of the advanced ClamAV features from the command-line and wraps it up in an incredibly simple user interface that the average Linux user can use."

== See also ==
- ClamWin - a graphical interface for ClamAV for Microsoft Windows
