= Immunet =

Software

- Developer: Cisco Systems
- Stable release: 7.5.10, / June 9, 2023; 3 years ago
- Operating system: Windows 7 and later
- Type: Antivirus
- License: Freemium
- Website: www.immunet.com

Immunet was a free, cloud-based, community-driven antivirus application, using the ClamAV and its own engine. The software was complementary with existing antivirus software. In January 2011 Immunet was acquired by Sourcefire.

The application was free-of-charge, although a commercial version is available. It claimed to be lightweight and provided up-to-date protection against the threats. Virus signature files were stored in the cloud, not on individual computers, so signature downloads were not required. Once a virus was detected and blocked for one user, all other Immunet users received the same protection almost instantly. The software was noted for its ability to allow individual users to easily author their own signatures.

Immunet ceased services on January 1, 2024.

== Products ==
Immunet was previously provided by Sourcefire in two editions, Free (for personal use), and Plus (for commercial use). As of June 10, 2014, the commercial version was discontinued, though Cisco (having acquired SourceFire) continued to support the free version.

At version 3.0 as of 2014, Immunet Free offers protection based upon the virus definitions in the cloud, and an option to include the ClamAV off-line virus definitions for use when not connected to the Internet. Immunet advises that the free version be used alongside another antivirus program, and supports several particular such programs in the sense that they co-install properly and work in tandem during normal operations without any obvious interference or resource drag. This is a significant difference between Immunet and other contemporary antivirus products.

== Effectiveness ==
While independent testing has been performed, PCMag, in 2010, rated the product to be fair in its effectiveness.

Immunet's virus definitions are stored on servers available over the Internet, requiring less memory and system resource than antivirus programs that reside on the user's computer. Cloud protection has been known to give better protection and detection, on the other hand, offline protection is not particularly good. Overall, the effectiveness of the Free product is average; the company recommends that users employ the Free product as an additional protection, rather than using it alone.

In Windows 8.1 and 10, older versions of Immunet such as 3.x only satisfies Virus protection but not Spyware and unwanted software protection in Action Center alerts on toolbar unlike other commercial antiviruses which satisfy both.

== Discontinuation ==
On January 1, 2024, Immunet ceased its services. The product will no longer have a connection to the cloud servers. According to its main website, Cisco aims to continue contributing to cybersecurity through Talos threat intelligence, but Immunet does not fit this purpose. The Immunet Forum also shut down all operations on February 1, 2024.
