= Fully qualified domain address =

A fully qualified domain address (FQDA) is a string forming an Internet e-mail address. It was defined by the Internet Engineering Task Force in RFC 3801 for the use in voice profiles for Internet mail, but has been used on the Internet as early as 1988.

A FQDA is composed of a local part, followed by the symbol @ and the fully qualified domain name (FQDN) of the host responsible for a mailbox.

An example of a FQDA is: localpart@mailhost.example.com. The local part usually denotes a username, while the fully qualified domain name is used by mail transfer agents to determine the IP address of the host by querying the Domain Name System.
