= Policyd-weight =

Email filter

policyd-weight is a mail filter for the Postfix mail transfer agent (MTA) written in Perl. It allows postfix to evaluate mail envelope information and to score mail against several DNS-based Blackhole Lists (DNSBL) before the mail is queued. The final score will determine whether a mail is rejected or accepted, in which case it is usually then subject to more resource intensive checks by a virus scanner and spam filter.

== Features ==
policyd-weight is a policy server for Postfix, written in Perl, designed to score various aspects of incoming emails to reduce spam, such as:

- DNSBLs/RHSBLs - HELO and MAIL FROM arguments - Client IP address - DNS client/HELO/FROM entries (A/16 A/24 A/32, PTR/FQDN, Parent Domains, MX/16 MX/24 MX/32)

It aims to improve the accuracy of email rejection by scoring these elements, without parsing the entire email, unlike other filters. This allows the system to reject clearly forged or misconfigured emails without receiving the full message, saving bandwidth and improving efficiency. It caches frequent client/sender combinations and minimizes DNS lookups for speed.

However, policyd-weight is not a spam or virus filter, as it doesn't analyze email content. It also cannot reject emails from correctly configured MTAs, such as emails forwarded from valid accounts (e.g., from Yahoo).

== Licensing ==
policyd-weight is Free software, licensed and released under the GNU General Public License

== See also ==
- Postfix SMTP Access Policy Delegation
- Postfix Add-on Software
