= Milter =

- Type: MTA extension
- Website: milter.org at the Wayback Machine (archived 2015-05-10)

Milter (portmanteau for mail filter) is an extension to the widely used open source mail transfer agents (MTA) Sendmail and Postfix. It allows administrators to add mail filters for filtering spam or viruses in the mail-processing chain. In the language of the art, "milter" refers to the protocol and API implementing the service, while "a milter" has come to refer to a filter application that uses milter to provide service.

== History ==
Prior to the advent of milter, an email filter was generally implemented as a program to which an MTA would hand the message once it has completely arrived, with most of the message's envelope information removed. That program could then analyze the header and body of the message and make a decision to accept the message (i.e. return a "success" status to the MTA) or reject it (i.e. return a "failed" status to the MTA). The MTA would then log a successful delivery or return a failure message to the sender as appropriate, and the filter would be responsible for affecting the delivery of the message (to the intended inbox(es) as-is, or modified to remove unwanted content, or to specific folder(s), etc.).

An MTA that is milter-capable instead notifies filters to which it is connected about each phase of the delivery of a message, from initial client connection through completion of transmission. At each phase of the SMTP session, the filter is given data about the arriving message and then has an opportunity to terminate acceptance of the message early when appropriate. For very large messages, this can have an enormous impact when a decision to reject can be made as early as possible. Moreover, unlike the former model, a milter-capable MTA can connect to multiple filters in parallel that serve specific purposes such as anti-virus, anti-spam, message authentication, flow regulation, etc. Finally, such filters can take special action on the message: add or remove recipients in the envelope; alter the body prior to delivery; add, change or remove header fields in the message, etc.

The Sendmail Consortium includes a special thread-based library in the sendmail distribution that provides the milter API.

== MTAs ==
=== Sendmail ===
Milter was first officially introduced to Sendmail 8.12.0 released on September 8, 2001. Milter was available in sendmail 8.11.x versions as an FFR (For Future Release/Beta code). Milter has undergone substantial improvements since its first official release.

=== Postfix ===
Milter support was added to Postfix 2.3.0 released July 12, 2006. Many, but not all, milters can be used with Postfix "out of the box".

== Interface ==
The Sendmail Consortium provides a documented Application Programming Interface that can be used to create milters for special needs. The library provided by The Sendmail Consortium is pthread-based. However, documentation of the protocol used for communication between sendmail and milter processes is not provided. This internal protocol is subject to changes in new sendmail versions.

== Sample Milters ==
- MIMEDefang
- ClamAV
- Amavis with the tool amavis-milter
- Rspamd
