= Apache SpamAssassin =

Open-source e-mail spam filter

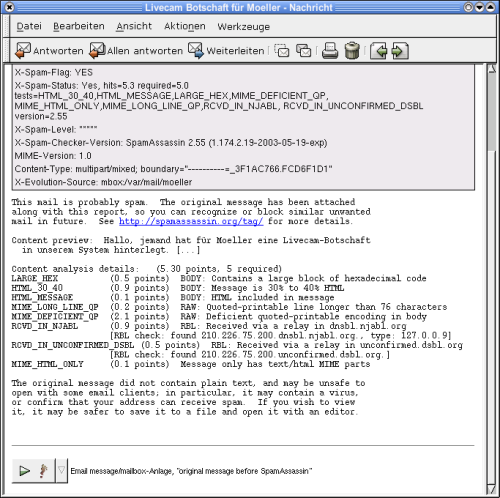
- Developer: Apache Software Foundation
- Initial release: April 20, 2001; 24 years ago
- Stable release: 4.0.2 / 30 August 2025; 4 months ago
- Repository: SpamAssassin Repository
- Written in: Perl, C
- Operating system: Cross-platform
- Type: Spam filter
- License: Apache License 2.0
- Website: spamassassin.apache.org

Apache SpamAssassin is a computer program used for e-mail spam filtering. It uses a variety of spam-detection techniques, including DNS and fuzzy checksum techniques, Bayesian filtering, external programs, blacklists and online databases. It is released under the Apache License 2.0 and is a part of the Apache Foundation since 2004.

The program can be integrated with the mail server to automatically filter all mail for a site. It can also be run by individual users on their own mailbox and integrates with several mail programs. Apache SpamAssassin is highly configurable; if used as a system-wide filter it can still be configured to support per-user preferences.

== History ==
Apache SpamAssassin was created by Justin Mason, who had maintained a number of patches against an earlier program named filter.plx by Mark Jeftovic, which in turn was begun in August 1997. Mason rewrote all of Jeftovic's code from scratch and uploaded the resulting codebase to SourceForge on April 20, 2001.

In Summer 2004 the project became an Apache Software Foundation project and later officially renamed to Apache SpamAssassin.

== Methods of usage ==
Apache SpamAssassin is a Perl-based application (Mail::SpamAssassin in CPAN) which is usually used to filter all incoming mail for one or several users. It can be run as a standalone application or as a subprogram of another application (such as a Milter, SA-Exim, Exiscan, MailScanner, MIMEDefang, Amavis) or as a client (spamc) that communicates with a daemon (spamd). The client/server or embedded mode of operation has performance benefits, but under certain circumstances may introduce additional security risks.

Typically either variant of the application is set up in a generic mail filter program, or it is called directly from a mail user agent that supports this, whenever new mail arrives. Mail filter programs such as procmail can be made to pipe all incoming mail through Apache SpamAssassin with an adjustment to a user's procmailrc file.

== Operation ==
Apache SpamAssassin comes with a large set of rules which are applied to determine whether an email is spam or not. Most rules are based on regular expressions that are matched against the body or header fields of the message, but Apache SpamAssassin also employs a number of other spam-fighting techniques. The rules are called "tests" in the SpamAssassin documentation.

Each test has a score value that will be assigned to a message if it matches the test's criteria. The scores can be positive or negative, with positive values indicating "spam" and negative "ham" (non-spam messages). A message is matched against all tests and Apache SpamAssassin combines the results into a global score which is assigned to the message. The higher the score, the higher the probability that the message is spam.

Apache SpamAssassin has an internal (configurable) score threshold to classify a message as spam. Usually a message will only be considered as spam if it matches multiple criteria; matching just a single test will not usually be enough to reach the threshold.

If Apache SpamAssassin considers a message to be spam, it can be further rewritten. In the default configuration, the content of the mail is appended as a MIME attachment, with a brief excerpt in the message body, and a description of the tests which resulted in the mail being classified as spam. If the score is lower than the defined settings, by default the information about the tests passed and total score is still added to the email headers and can be used in post-processing for less severe actions, such as tagging the mail as suspicious.

Apache SpamAssassin allows for a per-user configuration of its behavior, even if installed as system-wide service; the configuration can be read from a file or a database. In their configuration users can specify individuals whose emails are never considered spam, or change the scores for certain rules. The user can also define a list of languages which they want to receive mail in, and Apache SpamAssassin then assigns a higher score to all mails that appear to be written in another language.

Apache SpamAssassin is based on heuristics (pattern recognition), and such software exhibits false positives and false negatives.

== Network-based filtering methods ==
Apache SpamAssassin also supports:

- DNS-based blacklists and DNS-based whitelists
- Fuzzy-checksum-based spam detection filters such as the Distributed Checksum Clearinghouse, Vipul's Razor and the Cloudmark Authority plugins (commercial)
- Hashcash email stamps based on proof-of-work
- Sender Policy Framework and DomainKeys Identified Mail
- URI blacklists such as SURBL or URIBL which track spam websites

More methods can be added reasonably easily by writing a Perl plug-in for Apache SpamAssassin.

== Bayesian filtering ==
Apache SpamAssassin reinforces its rules through Bayesian filtering where a user or administrator "feeds" examples of good (ham) and bad (spam) into the filter in order to learn the difference between the two. For this purpose, Apache SpamAssassin provides the command-line tool sa-learn, which can be instructed to learn a single mail or an entire mailbox as either ham or spam.

Typically, the user will move unrecognized spam to a separate folder, and then run sa-learn on the folder of non-spam and on the folder of spam separately. Alternatively, if the mail user agent supports it, sa-learn can be called for individual emails. Regardless of the method used to perform the learning, SpamAssassin's Bayesian test will help score future e-mails based on this learning to improve the accuracy.

== Licensing ==
Apache SpamAssassin is free/open source software, licensed under the Apache License 2.0. Versions prior to 3.0 are dual-licensed under the Artistic License and the GNU General Public License.

Many commercially available anti-spam packages integrate SpamAssassin as part of their products, such as SpamKiller by McAfee and Kerio MailServer by Kerio.

== sa-compile ==
sa-compile is a utility distributed with Apache SpamAssassin that compiles a SpamAssassin ruleset into a deterministic finite automaton that allows Apache SpamAssassin to use processor power more efficiently.

== Testing ==
Apache SpamAssassin is designed to trigger on the GTUBE, a 68-byte string similar to the antivirus EICAR test file. If this string is inserted in an RFC 5322 formatted message and passed through the Apache SpamAssassin engine, Apache SpamAssassin will trigger with a weight of 1000.

== See also ==
- Anti-spam techniques
