= Kon-Boot =

Password bypass software

- Developer: Piotr Bania
- Release: July 15, 2008; 18 years ago
- Stable release: 5.1 / June 16, 2026; 3 months ago
- Operating system: Windows and macOS systems
- Website: www.piotrbania.com/all/kon-boot/

Kon-Boot (aka konboot, kon boot) is a software utility that allows users to bypass Microsoft Windows passwords and Apple macOS passwords (Linux support has been deprecated) without lasting or persistent changes to system on which it is executed. It is also the first reported tool and so far the only one capable of bypassing Windows 11 and Windows 10 online (live) passwords and supported by both Windows and macOS systems. It is also a widely used tool in computer security, especially in penetration testing. Since version 3.5, Kon-Boot is also able to bypass SecureBoot.

Kon-Boot booting from USB

== History ==
Kon-Boot was originally designed as a proof of concept, freeware security tool, mostly for people who tend to forget their passwords. The main idea was to allow users to log in to the target computer without knowing the correct password and without making any persistent changes to the system on which it was executed.

The first Kon-Boot release was announced in 2008 on DailyDave mailing list. Version 1.0 (freeware) allowed users to login into Linux based operating systems and to bypass the authentication process (allowing access to the system without knowing the password).

In 2009 the author of the software announced Kon-Boot for Linux and 32-bit Microsoft Windows systems. This release provided additional support for bypassing Windows systems passwords on any Windows operating system starting from Windows Server 2008 to Windows 7. This version is still available as freeware.

The newest Kon-Boot releases are available only as commercial products and are still maintained.

The current version is able to bypass passwords on the following operating systems:

Supported Microsoft Windows operating systems
Microsoft Windows XP
Microsoft Windows Vista Home Basic 32Bit/64Bit
Microsoft Windows Vista Home Premium 32Bit/64Bit
Microsoft Windows Vista Business 32Bit/64Bit
Microsoft Windows Vista Enterprise 32Bit/64Bit
Microsoft Windows Server 2003 Standard 32Bit/64Bit
Microsoft Windows Server 2003 Datacenter 32Bit/64Bit
Microsoft Windows Server 2003 Enterprise 32Bit/64Bit
Microsoft Windows Server 2003 Web Edition 32Bit/64Bit
Microsoft Windows Server 2008 Standard 32Bit/64Bit
Microsoft Windows Server 2008 Datacenter 32Bit/64Bit
Microsoft Windows Server 2008 Enterprise 32Bit/64Bit
Microsoft Windows 7 Home Premium 32Bit/64Bit
Microsoft Windows 7 Professional 32Bit/64Bit
Microsoft Windows 7 Ultimate 32Bit/64Bit
Microsoft Windows 8 and 8.1 all versions (32Bit/64Bit—includes live/online password bypass)
Microsoft Windows 10 all versions (32Bit/64Bit—includes live/online password bypass)
Microsoft Windows 11 all versions (64Bit, UEFI - Windows 11 installation requirements)

Supported Apple macOS / OS X operating systems
Apple OS X 10.6
Apple OS X 10.7
Apple OS X 10.8
Apple OS X 10.9
Apple OS X 10.10
Apple OS X 10.11
Apple macOS Sierra (10.12)
Apple macOS High Sierra (10.13)
Apple macOS Mojave (10.14)
Apple macOS Catalina (10.15)
Apple macOS Big Sur (11)
Apple macOS Monterey (12)
Apple macOS Ventura (13)
Apple macOS Sonoma (14)
Apple macOS Sequoia (15)
Apple macOS Tahoe (26)

== Technology ==
Kon-Boot works like a bootkit (thus it also often creates false positive alerts in antivirus software). It injects (hides) itself into BIOS memory. Kon-Boot modifies the kernel code on the fly (runtime), temporarily changing the code responsible for verification user's authorization data while the operating system loads.

In contrast to password reset tools like CHNTPW (The Offline NT Password Editor), Kon-Boot does not modify system files and SAM hive, all changes are temporary and they disappear after system reboots.

== Additional Features ==
While by default Kon-Boot bypasses Windows passwords it also includes some additional features that are worth noting:

- Kon-Boot can change Windows passwords due to the embedded Sticky-Keys feature. For example after successful Windows boot with Kon-Boot user can tap SHIFT key 5 times and Kon-Boot will open a Windows console window running with local system privileges. The fully working console can be used for a variety of purposes. For example, to change the Windows password the following command can be used: net user [username] [newpassword](selected user can be later added as new Windows administrator by typing: net localgroup administrators [username] /add). The command net user [username] * will erase the current Windows password for the selected user.
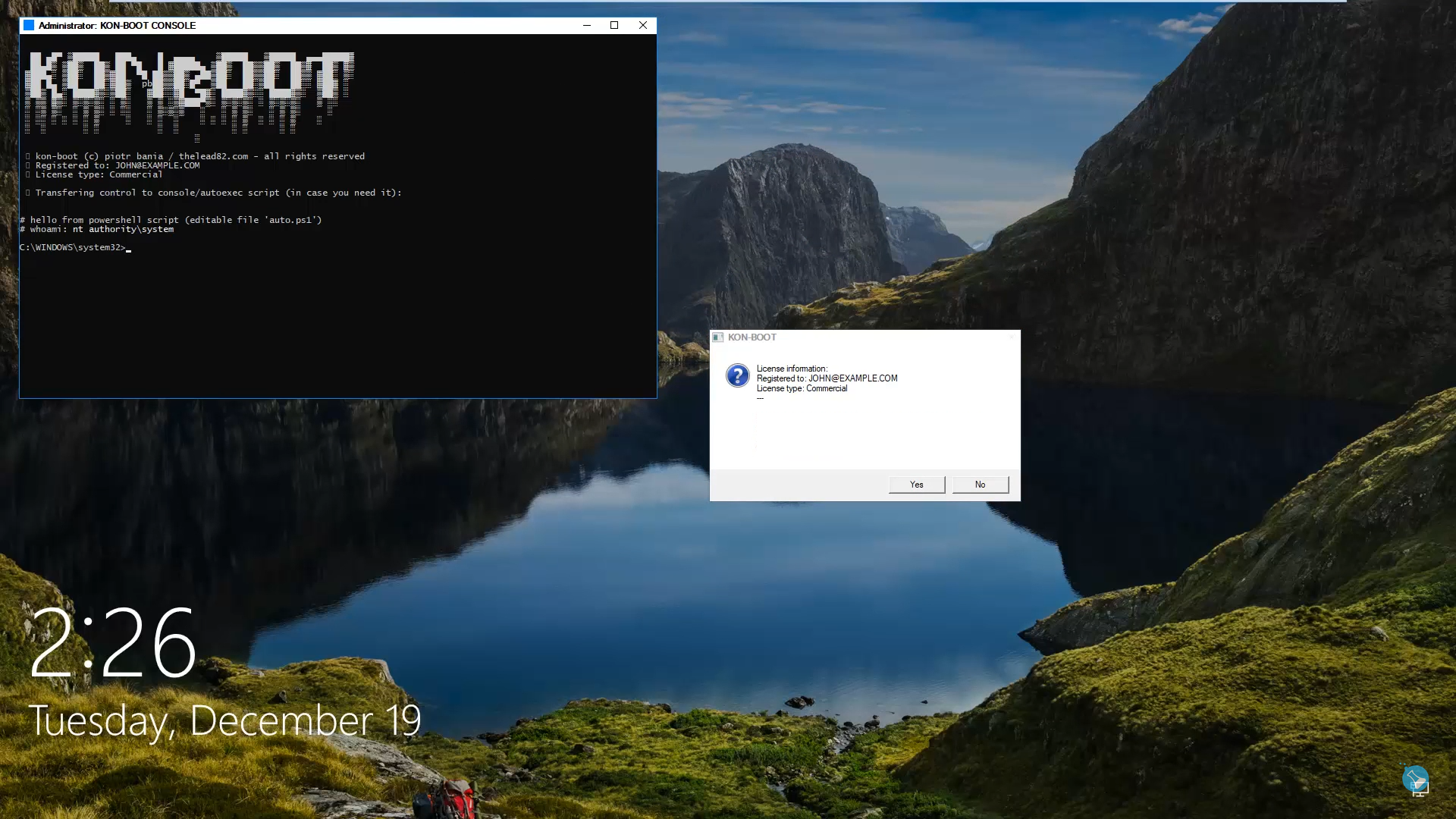
  Kon-Boot automatically executing PowerShell script with system privileges
  In the commercial Kon-Boot editions it is possible to use Automatic PowerShell Script Execution which automatically executes (after Windows boot) a given PowerShell script with full system privileges. This feature can be used to automatize various tasks, for example, data gathering. To use this feature, Windows needs to be installed in UEFI mode.

== Limitations (prevention) ==
Users concerned about tools like Kon-Boot should use disk encryption (FileVault, Bitlocker, Veracrypt etc.) software as Kon-Boot is not able to bypass disk encryption. BIOS password and enabled SecureBoot is also a good prevention measure. However, since version 3.5, Kon-Boot is able to bypass SecureBoot. Kon-Boot does not support virtualization and instructs users to turn it off in the BIOS. Kon-Boot does not support ARM devices such as Apple's M1 chip (newest Apple ARM devices does not support booting from 3rd party media).
