= SMTP Authentication =

Extension of Internet protocol

SMTP Authentication, often abbreviated SMTP AUTH, is an extension of the Simple Mail Transfer Protocol (SMTP) whereby a client may log in using any authentication mechanism supported by the server. It is mainly used by submission servers, where authentication is mandatory.

== History ==
SMTP as specified by Jon Postel in the 1970s did not provide for using passwords for sending email messages; each server was by design an open mail relay. As a result, spam and worms, while not initially a problem, had become a plague by the late '90s. Before SMTP AUTH, a relay client had to be identified by IP address, which is only practical for email services provided by the same Internet service provider (ISP) supplying the connection, or else using specific hacks, such as POP before SMTP.

John Gardiner Myers published the first draft of SMTP AUTH in 1995, and it has been successively developed and discussed in the IETF along with mail submission protocol, Extended SMTP (ESMTP), and Simple Authentication and Security Layer (SASL). An older SASL mechanism for ESMTP authentication (ESMTPA) is CRAM-MD5, and uses of the MD5 algorithm in HMACs (hash-based message authentication codes) are still considered sound.

The Internet Mail Consortium (IMC) reported that 55% of mail servers were open relays in 1998, but less than 1% in 2002.

== Role in the mail transport system ==
Using a mail submission agent (MSA), generally on port 587, implies SMTP AUTH. MSA usage is supported by most software and is recommended, especially to support nomadic users, as several network hubs either block port 25 or use SMTP proxies. The MSA is responsible for ensuring that the message envelope contains good addresses, and may enforce local policies for the From header field. Verifying that the envelope sender (a.k.a. Return-Path) used for SPF and the From address agree with the authenticated user-id is particularly important for domains that sign messages using DKIM.

Keywords ending in "A" such as ESMTPA and ESMTPSA, are provided for the with clause of Received header fields, when messages are received with SMTP AUTH. "The keywords are provided for statistical or diagnostic purposes" (RFC 3848); they are checked by some clients, e.g. Spamassassin.

== Details ==
As with all SMTP extensions, SMTP AUTH is advertised in the EHLO response, along with a list of supported authentication methods. These methods may change after issuing STARTTLS, typically allowing plain text passwords in the latter case only. RFC 4954 provides the following example ("C:" and "S:" are not part of the protocol, they indicate lines sent by the client and server, respectively):

S: 220 smtp.example.com ESMTP Server
C: EHLO client.example.com
S: 250-smtp.example.com Hello client.example.com
S: 250-AUTH GSSAPI DIGEST-MD5
S: 250-ENHANCEDSTATUSCODES
S: 250 STARTTLS
C: STARTTLS
S: 220 Ready to start TLS
    ... TLS negotiation proceeds. 
     Further commands protected by TLS layer ...
C: EHLO client.example.com
S: 250-smtp.example.com Hello client.example.com
S: 250 AUTH GSSAPI DIGEST-MD5 PLAIN
C: AUTH PLAIN aWxvdmV3aWtpcGVkaWE=
S: 235 2.7.0 Authentication successful

SMTP AUTH can be used also on port 25. Usually, servers reject RCPT TO commands that imply relaying unless authentication credentials have been accepted. The specification recommends that servers issue 530 5.7.0 Authentication required in response to most commands in case the server is configured to require authentication and the client hasn't done it yet. Only servers listening on port 587, or private servers, should be configured that way, not a Message eXchange (MX). However, the historical trait that SMTP is not authenticated by default results in a different behavior with regard to access protocols, in some cases; for example, when using AUTH EXTERNAL after STARTTLS.

Besides the AUTH command, the extension also provides for an AUTH parameter to the MAIL FROM command, so as to allow to distinguish authentication from authorization. That way, a sender can identify itself and transmit several messages during the same session. While the authentication doesn't need to vary, once established, different messages may be sent according to different agreements and hence require different authorization. For example, messages may be relayed on behalf of different users. Use of this parameter is much less popular than using the command to grant relay privileges.

SMTP Authentication is an "extension" in SMTP terms, so it requires server and client to use EHLO verb for greeting to indicate support for extensions, as opposed to the obsolete HELO greeting. For backward compatibility, HELO greeting may be accepted when no extension is used.

The capitalized text after the AUTH command is a list of the types of authorization that the SMTP server will accept.

Some examples of authorization protocols include:

- PLAIN (Uses Base64 encoding)
- LOGIN (Uses Base64 encoding) (obsoleted in favor of PLAIN)
- GSSAPI (Generic Security Services Application Program Interface)
- DIGEST-MD5 (Digest access authentication)
- MD5
- CRAM-MD5
- OAUTH10A (OAuth 1.0a HMAC-SHA1 tokens as defined in RFC 5849)
- OAUTHBEARER (OAuth 2.0 bearer tokens as defined in RFC 6750)
- XOAUTH2

== Standards ==
- RFC 3207, SMTP Service Extension for Secure SMTP over Transport Layer Security, Paul Hoffman, February 2002.
- RFC 3848, ESMTP and LMTP Transmission Types Registration, Chris Newman, July 2004.
- RFC 6409, Message Submission for Mail, Randall Gellens and John C. Klensin, November 2011 (obsoletes RFC 4409, from 2006, which in turn replaced RFC 2476, from December 1998).
- RFC 4422, Simple Authentication and Security Layer (SASL), Alexey Melnikov and Kurt D. Zeilenga, June 2006.
- RFC 4616, The PLAIN SASL Mechanism, K. Zeilenga, Ed., August 2006.
- RFC 4954, SMTP Service Extension for Authentication, Robert Siemborski and Alexey Melnikov, July 2007.
- RFC 7628, A Set of Simple Authentication and Security Layer (SASL) Mechanisms for OAuth, W. Mills, T. Showalter and H. Tschofenig, August 2015.

== Other ==
- Erwin Hoffmann, SMTP Authentication [Tutorial], last edit 2017-01-10.

== See also ==
- E-mail authentication
- Simple Mail Transfer Protocol
- Mail submission agent
- Email client port numbers
- Simple Authentication and Security Layer
- Open mail relay
- POP before SMTP
