= Challenge–response authentication =

Type of authentication protocol

In computer security, challenge–response authentication is a family of protocols in which one party presents a question ("challenge") and another party must provide a valid answer ("response") to be authenticated.

The simplest example of a challenge–response protocol is password authentication, where the challenge is asking for the password and the valid response is the correct password.

An adversary who can eavesdrop on a password authentication can authenticate themselves by reusing the intercepted password. One solution is to issue multiple passwords, each of them marked with an identifier. The verifier can then present an identifier, and the prover must respond with the correct password for that identifier. Assuming that the passwords are chosen independently, an adversary who intercepts one challenge–response message pair has no clues to help with a different challenge at a different time.

For example, when other communications security methods are unavailable, the U.S. military uses the AKAC-1553 TRIAD numeral cipher to authenticate and encrypt some communications. TRIAD includes a list of three-letter challenge codes, which the verifier is supposed to choose randomly from, and random three-letter responses to them. For added security, each set of codes is only valid for a particular time period which is ordinarily 24 hours.

Another basic challenge–response technique works as follows. Bob is controlling access to some resource, and Alice is seeking entry. Bob issues the challenge "52w72y". Alice must respond with the one string of characters which "fits" the challenge Bob issued. The "fit" is determined by an algorithm defined in advance, and known by both Bob and Alice. The correct response might be as simple as "63x83z", with the algorithm changing each character of the challenge using a Caesar cipher. In reality, the algorithm would be much more complex. Bob issues a different challenge each time, and thus knowing a previous correct response (even if it is not obfuscated by the means of communication) does not allow an adversary to determine the current correct response.

== Other non-cryptographic protocols ==
Challenge–response protocols are also used in non-cryptographic applications. CAPTCHAs, for example, are meant to allow websites and applications to determine whether an interaction was performed by a genuine user rather than a web scraper or bot. In early CAPTCHAs, the challenge sent to the user was a distorted image of some text, and the user responded by transcribing the text. The distortion was designed to make automated optical character recognition (OCR) difficult and prevent a computer program from passing as a human.

== Cryptographic techniques ==
Non-cryptographic authentication was generally adequate in the days before the Internet, when the user could be sure that the system asking for the password was really the system they were trying to access, and that nobody was likely to be eavesdropping on the communication channel. To address the insecure channel problem, a more sophisticated approach is necessary. Many cryptographic solutions involve two-way authentication; both the user and the system must verify that they know the shared secret (the password), without the secret ever being transmitted in the clear over the communication channel.

One way this is done involves using the password as the encryption key to transmit some randomly generated information as the challenge, whereupon the other end must return as its response a similarly encrypted value which is some predetermined function of the originally offered information, thus proving that it was able to decrypt the challenge. For instance, in Kerberos, the challenge is an encrypted integer N, while the response is the encrypted integer N + 1, proving that the other end was able to decrypt the integer N. A hash function can also be applied to a password and a random challenge value to create a response value. Another variation uses a probabilistic model to provide randomized challenges conditioned on model input.

Such encrypted or hashed exchanges do not directly reveal the password to an eavesdropper. However, they may supply enough information to allow an eavesdropper to deduce what the password is, using a dictionary attack or brute-force attack. The use of information which is randomly generated on each exchange (and where the response is different from the challenge) guards against the possibility of a replay attack, where a malicious intermediary simply records the exchanged data and retransmits it at a later time to fool one end into thinking it has authenticated a new connection attempt from the other.

Authentication protocols usually employ a cryptographic nonce as the challenge to ensure that every challenge–response sequence is unique. This protects against Eavesdropping with a subsequent replay attack. If it is impractical to implement a true nonce, a strong cryptographically secure pseudorandom number generator and cryptographic hash function can generate challenges that are highly unlikely to occur more than once. It is sometimes important not to use time-based nonces, as these can weaken servers in different time zones and servers with inaccurate clocks. It can also be important to use time-based nonces and synchronized clocks if the application is vulnerable to a delayed message attack. This attack occurs where an attacker copies a transmission whilst blocking it from reaching the destination, allowing them to replay the captured transmission after a delay of their choosing. This is easily accomplished on wireless channels. The time-based nonce can be used to limit the attacker to resending the message but restricted by an expiry time of perhaps less than one second, likely having no effect upon the application and so mitigating the attack.

Mutual authentication is performed using a challenge–response handshake in both directions; the server ensures that the client knows the secret, and the client also ensures that the server knows the secret, which protects against a rogue server impersonating the real server.

Challenge–response authentication can help solve the problem of exchanging session keys for encryption. Using a key derivation function, the challenge value and the secret may be combined to generate an unpredictable encryption key for the session. This is particularly effective against a man-in-the-middle attack, because the attacker will not be able to derive the session key from the challenge without knowing the secret, and therefore will not be able to decrypt the data stream.

== Simple example mutual authentication sequence ==
- Server sends a unique challenge value sc to the client
- Client sends a unique challenge value cc to the server
- Server computes sr = hash(cc + secret) and sends to the client
- Client computes cr = hash(sc + secret) and sends to the server
- Server calculates the expected value of cr and ensures the client responded correctly
- Client calculates the expected value of sr and ensures the server responded correctly

where

- sc is the server-generated challenge
- cc is the client-generated challenge
- cr is the client response
- sr is the server response

This particular example is vulnerable to a reflection attack.

== Password storage ==
To avoid storage of passwords, some operating systems (e.g. Unix-type) store a hash of the password rather than storing the password itself. During authentication, the system needs only verify that the hash of the password entered matches the hash stored in the password database. This makes it more difficult for an intruder to get the passwords, since the password itself is not stored, and it is very difficult to determine a password that matches a given hash. However, this presents a problem for many (but not all) challenge–response algorithms, which require both the client and the server to have a shared secret. Since the password itself is not stored, a challenge–response algorithm will usually have to use the hash of the password as the secret instead of the password itself. In this case, an intruder can use the actual hash, rather than the password, which makes the stored hashes just as sensitive as the actual passwords. SCRAM is a challenge–response algorithm that avoids this problem.

== Examples ==
Examples of more sophisticated challenge–response algorithms are:

- Zero-knowledge password proof and key agreement systems (such as Secure Remote Password (SRP))
- Challenge-Handshake Authentication Protocol (CHAP) (RFC 1994)
- CRAM-MD5, OCRA: OATH Challenge–Response Algorithm (RFC 6287)
- Salted Challenge Response Authentication Mechanism (SCRAM) (RFC 5802)
- ssh's challenge–response system based on RSA.

Some people consider a CAPTCHA a kind of challenge–response authentication that blocks spambots.

== See also ==
- Challenge-Handshake Authentication Protocol
- Challenge–response spam filtering
- Countersign (military)
- CRAM-MD5
- Cryptographic hash function
- Cryptographic nonce
- Distance-bounding protocol
- Kerberos (protocol)
- Man-in-the-middle attack
- Needham–Schroeder protocol
- Otway–Rees protocol
- Password-authenticated key agreement
- Reflection attack
- Replay attack
- Salted Challenge Response Authentication Mechanism (SCRAM)
- SQRL
- WebAuthn
- Wide Mouth Frog protocol
