= ODMR =

ODMR may refer to:

- On-Demand Mail Relay
- Optically detected magnetic resonance, a double resonance technique which combines electron paramagnetic resonance with measurements such as fluorescence, phosphorescence and absorption
