= Jeremy Allison =

Computer programmer

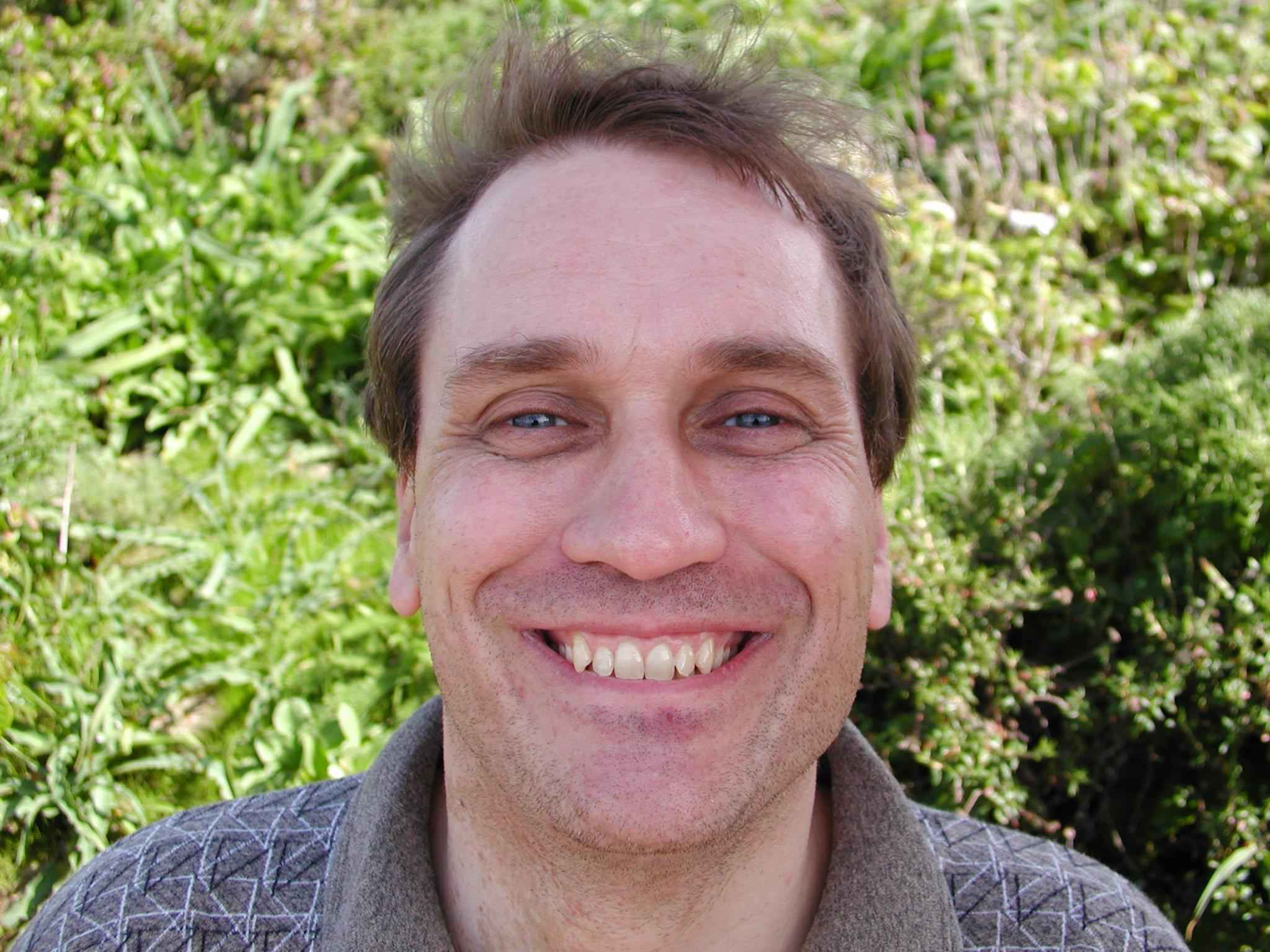
- Born: 1962 (age 63–64)
- Occupation: Programmer
- Employer: Ctrl IQ
- Known for: Samba
- Website: www.samba.org/~jra/

Jeremy Allison is a computer programmer known for his contributions to the free software community, notably to Samba, a re-implementation of SMB/CIFS networking protocol, released under the GNU General Public License.

Other contributions include the early versions of the pwdump password cracking utility.

== Career ==
=== Free software evangelism ===
During his career, Jeremy Allison has consistently defended the free software approach:

- He pitched making Vantive Corporation code free software to its founder.
- He persuaded Michael Tiemann to use the GNU General Public License for Cygwin.
- He similarly convinced Tim Wilkinson to put the Kaffe virtual machine for Java under the GPL.
- He was involved in Silicon Graphics' decision to put XFS for Linux under the GPL.

This commitment to free software culminated with his decision to leave Novell in protest of a patent deal that was considered by many as a FUD attack on Linux and other free software, and by Allison as breaking section 7 of the GNU General Public License.
