= Smart host =

Type of email server

A smart host or smarthost is an email server via which third parties can send emails and have them forwarded on to the email recipients' email servers.

Smarthosts were originally open mail relays, but most providers now require authentication from the sender, to verify that the sender is authorised – for example, an ISP might run a smarthost for their paying customers only.

== Use in spam control efforts ==
In an effort to reduce email spam originating from their customer's IP addresses, some internet service providers (ISPs), will not allow their customers to communicate directly with recipient mailservers via the default SMTP port number 25. Instead, often they will set up a smarthost to which their customers can direct all their outward mail – or customers could alternatively use one of the commercial smarthost services.

Sometimes, even if an outward port 25 is not blocked, an individual or organisation's normal external IP address has a difficulty in getting SMTP mail accepted. This could be because that IP was assigned in the past to someone who sent spam from it, or appears to be a dynamic address such as typically used for home connection. Whatever the reason for the "poor reputation" or "blacklisting", they can choose to redirect all their email out to an external smarthost for delivery.

== Reducing complexity ==
When a host runs its own local mail server, a smart host is often used to transmit all mail to other systems through a central mail server. This is used to ease the management of a single mail server with aliases, security, and Internet access rather than maintaining numerous local mail servers.

== See also ==
- Mail submission agent
