= Chntpw =

Windows password editing utility on Linux

chntpw
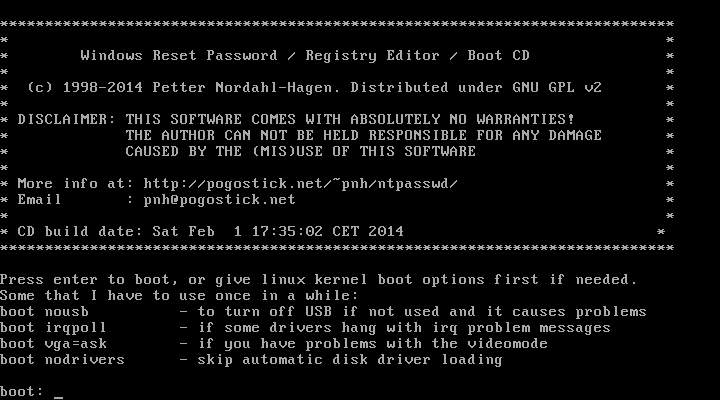
- Screenshot of initial running
- Developer(s): Petter Nordahl-Hagen (Formerly Petter Nordahl)
- Initial release: May 28, 1997; 27 years ago
- Stable release: 1.00 / February 1, 2014; 11 years ago
- Repository: pogostick.net/~pnh/ntpasswd/chntpw-source-140201.zip
- Written in: C
- Operating system: Linux
- Available in: English
- Type: Data recovery
- License: GPLv2
- Website: pogostick.net/~pnh/ntpasswd/

chntpw or Offline Windows Password & Registry Editor is a software utility for resetting or blanking local passwords used by Windows NT operating systems on Linux. It does this by editing the SAM database where Windows stores password hashes.

== Features ==
There are two ways to use the program: via the standalone chntpw utility installed as a package available in most modern Linux distributions (e.g. Ubuntu) or via a bootable CD/USB image. There also was a floppy release, but its support has been dropped.

== Limitations ==
chntpw has no support for fully encrypted NTFS partitions (the only possible exceptions to this are encrypted partitions readable by Linux such as LUKS), usernames containing Unicode characters, or Active Directory passwords (with the exception of local users of systems that are members of an AD domain). The password changing feature is also prone to errors, so password blanking is highly recommended (in fact, for later versions of Windows it is the only possible option). Furthermore, the bootable image might have problems with controllers requiring 3rd party drivers. In such cases use of the stand-alone program in a full-featured Linux environment is recommended.

== Where it is used ==
The chntpw utility is included in many various Linux distributions, including ones focused on security:

- Kali – security-focused Linux distribution
- SystemRescueCD – recovery-focused Linux distribution
- Fedora – general distribution
- Ubuntu – Linux distribution published by Canonical

== License change ==
For the software's 10th anniversary, the author changed the license from a non-commercial one to the GNU General Public License (GPL) Version 2.
