= Simple Authentication and Security Layer =

Framework for authentication and data security in Internet protocols

Simple Authentication and Security Layer (SASL) is a framework for authentication and data security in Internet protocols. It decouples authentication mechanisms from application protocols, in theory allowing any authentication mechanism supported by SASL to be used in any application protocol that uses SASL. Authentication mechanisms can also support proxy authorization, a facility allowing one user to assume the identity of another. They can also provide a data security layer offering data integrity and data confidentiality services. DIGEST-MD5 provides an example of mechanisms which can provide a data-security layer. Application protocols that support SASL typically also support Transport Layer Security (TLS) to complement the services offered by SASL.

John Gardiner Myers wrote the original SASL specification (RFC 2222) in 1997. In 2006, that document was replaced by RFC 4422 authored by Alexey Melnikov and Kurt D. Zeilenga. SASL, as defined by RFC 4422 is an IETF Standard Track protocol and is, as of 2006, a Proposed Standard.

== SASL mechanisms ==
A SASL mechanism implements a series of challenges and responses. Defined SASL mechanisms include:

EXTERNAL
where authentication is implicit in the context (e.g., for protocols already using IPsec or TLS)
ANONYMOUS
for unauthenticated guest access
PLAIN
a simple cleartext password mechanism, defined in RFC 4616
OTP
a one-time password mechanism. Obsoletes the SKEY mechanism.
SKEY
an S/KEY mechanism.
CRAM-MD5
a simple challenge-response scheme based on HMAC-MD5.
DIGEST-MD5
(historic), partially HTTP Digest compatible challenge-response scheme based upon MD5. DIGEST-MD5 offered a data security layer.
SCRAM
(RFC 5802), modern challenge-response scheme based mechanism with channel binding support
NTLM
an NT LAN Manager authentication mechanism
GS2-
family of mechanisms supports arbitrary GSS-API mechanisms in SASL. It is now standardized as RFC 5801.
GSSAPI
for Kerberos V5 authentication via the GSSAPI. GSSAPI offers a data-security layer.
BROWSERID-AES128
for Mozilla Persona authentication
EAP-AES128
for GSS EAP authentication
MSN Chat GateKeeper (& GateKeeperPassport)
a challenge-response mechanism developed by Microsoft for MSN Chat
OAUTHBEARER
OAuth 2.0 bearer tokens (RFC 6750), communicated through TLS
OAUTH10A
OAuth 1.0a message-authentication-code tokens (RFC 5849, Section 3.4.2)

== SASL-aware application protocols ==
Application protocols define their representation of SASL exchanges with a profile. A protocol has a service name such as "ldap" in a registry shared with GSSAPI and Kerberos.

As of 2012 protocols currently supporting SASL include:

- Application Configuration Access Protocol (ACAP)
- Advanced Message Queuing Protocol (AMQP)
- Blocks Extensible Exchange Protocol (BEEP)
- Internet Message Access Protocol (IMAP)
- Internet Message Support Protocol (IMSP)
- Internet Relay Chat (IRC) (with IRCX or the IRCv3 SASL extension)
- Lightweight Directory Access Protocol (LDAP)
- libvirt
- ManageSieve (RFC 5804)
- memcached
- Post Office Protocol (POP)
- Remote Framebuffer (RFB) protocol used by VNC
- Simple Mail Transfer Protocol (SMTP)
- Subversion svn protocol
- Extensible Messaging and Presence Protocol (XMPP)

== See also ==
- Transport Layer Security (TLS)
