= Comparison of email clients =

The following tables compare general and technical features of notable standalone (offline) email client programs.

== General ==
Basic general information about the clients: creator/company, O/S, license, and interface.

No longer in active development

Client	Author/Developer	Operating system	Software license	User interface
BlitzMail	Dartmouth College	Windows	BSD licenses	GUI
Elm	Internet Promotion Agency S.A.	Windows, Android	BSD licenses	GUI
Evolution	The GNOME Project	Unix-like	LGPL-2.1-only or LGPL-3.0-only	GUI (GTK)
FirstClass	Open Text		Proprietary	GUI
Forté Agent	Mark Sidell	Windows	Proprietary	GUI
Geary	The GNOME Project (formerly Yorba Foundation)	Unix-like	LGPL-2.1-or-later	GUI (GTK)
GNUMail	Ludovic Marcotte and others	Unix-like, macOS	GPL-2.0-or-later	GUI
Gnus	Gnus team	Cross-platform	GPL-3.0-or-later	TUI and GUI
GroupWise	Micro Focus (formerly Novell)	Cross-platform	Proprietary	GUI
Hiri	Hiri	Cross-platform	Proprietary	GUI
i.Scribe, InScribe	Memecode	Windows, macOS, Linux	GPL-3.0-only	GUI
HCL Notes (formerly IBM Notes and Lotus Notes)	HCL Technologies (formerly IBM and Lotus Development), HCL Technologies	Windows, macOS, Linux	Proprietary	GUI (Notes), Web (Verse, iNotes) and Mobile (Traveler)
IMP	Horde LLC	Cross-platform	GPL-2.0-only	Webmail
K-9 Mail (now known as Thunderbird Mobile)	K-9 Dog Walkers: cketti, et al.	Android	Apache-2.0	GUI
KMail	KDE	Cross-platform	GNU General Public License	GUI (Qt)
Mail (Windows)	Microsoft	Windows	Proprietary	GUI
Mailbird	Mailbird	Windows	Proprietary	GUI
Mailpile	Mailpile	Windows, macOS, Linux	AGPL-3.0-or-later	Webmail
mailx	?	Unix-like	BSD Licenses	TUI
Microsoft Entourage	Microsoft	macOS	Proprietary	GUI
Microsoft Outlook	Microsoft	Windows, macOS	Proprietary	GUI
Mozilla Mail & Newsgroups	Mozilla Foundation		Mozilla Public License	GUI (XUL)
Mozilla Thunderbird	Mozilla Foundation	Cross-platform	MPL-2.0	GUI (XUL)
Mulberry	Cyrus Daboo (formerly Cyrusoft International, Inc./ISAMET)	Cross-platform	Apache-2.0	GUI
Mutt	Michael Elkins	Cross-platform	GPL-2.0-or-later	TUI (ncurses)
Netscape Messenger	Netscape Communications		?	GUI
Netscape Messenger 9	Netscape Communications		Mozilla Public License	GUI
Nylas Mail	Nylas	Windows, macOS, Linux	MIT	GUI
nmh / MH	RAND Corporation	Unix-like	BSD Licenses	CLI
Opera Mail	Opera Software	Cross-platform	Proprietary	GUI
Outlook Express	Microsoft	Windows	Proprietary	GUI
Pegasus Mail	David Harris	Windows	Proprietary	GUI
Pine	University of Washington	Cross-platform	Freeware	TUI
Pocomail	Poco Systems	Windows	Proprietary	GUI
RoundCube	The RoundCube Team	Cross-platform	GPL-3.0-or-later	Webmail
Samsung Email	Samsung Electronics	Samsung, Android 8+	Proprietary	GUI
SeaMonkey Mail & Newsgroups	SeaMonkey Council	Cross-platform	MPL-2.0	GUI (XUL)
Spark	Readdle	macOS	Proprietary	GUI
SquirrelMail	The SquirrelMail Project Team	Cross-platform	GPL-2.0-or-later	Webmail
Superhuman	Rahul Vohra	Cross-platform	Proprietary	Webmail
Sylpheed	Hiroyuki Yamamoto	Cross-platform	Sylpheed: GPL-2.0-or-later; LibSylph: LGPL-2.1-or-later	GUI (GTK2)
The Bat!	RitLabs	Windows	Proprietary	GUI
Trojitá	KDE	Cross-platform	GPL-2.0-only or GPL-3.0-only (Note: Or LicenseRef-KDE-Accepted-GPL: "Any later version accepted by the membership of KDE e.V. (or its successor approved by the membership of KDE e.V.), which shall act as a proxy defined in Section 14 of version 3 of the license.")	GUI (Qt)
Turnpike	Thus PLC (Demon Internet)	Windows	Proprietary	GUI
Vivaldi	Vivaldi Technologies AS	Cross-platform	Proprietary	GUI (Chrome)
Windows Live Mail	Microsoft	Windows	Proprietary	GUI
Windows Mail (Vista)	Microsoft	Windows	Proprietary	GUI
YAM	YAM Open Source Team and contributing authors	AmigaOS	GPL-2.0-or-later	GUI
Zimbra Desktop	Zimbra	Cross-platform	Mozilla Public License for server and ZPL for client	GUI

== Release history ==
A brief digest of the release histories.

Client	First public date	First public version	First stable date	First stable version	Latest stable release
Alpine	2006-11	0.8	2007 December	1.00	2.26 2 June 2022
Apple Mail	2001-03-24	?	?	?	
Becky! Internet Mail	1996	1	?	?	2.83.03 4 July 2026
Canary Mail	2017-06-15	1.0	2017-06-15	1.0	4.01 (5 June 2023)
Citadel	1987	?	1988	1.00	997 29 January 2024
Claws Mail	2001-05	0.4.67	2005-01	1.0.0	4.4.0 9 March 2026
Courier	2004-06	3.5	discontinued	discontinued	3.5 (June 2004) [±]
Elm	1986	?	1987-03	2	
eM Client	2007-11	1.0	2007-11	1.0	10.1.5131.0 (February 13, 2025; 20 months ago) [±]
EmailTray	2010-10	2.0	2011-03	3.11	4.0 (July 2, 2012; 14 years ago) [±]
Eudora	1988	?	1988	?	7.1 (Windows), 6.2.4 (Mac OS) (October 11, 2006; 20 years ago) [±]
Evolution	2000-05-11	0.0	2001-12-03	1.0	3.62.1 9 October 2026
Forté Agent	?	?	?	?	8 (October 20, 2014; 12 years ago) [±]
Geary	2012	0.1	2012	0.1	46.0 20 May 2024
Gnus	1987	?	1988-02-01	2.0	2015-04-06
GroupWise	?	?	1986	1.0	18.4 14 March 2022
Hiri	2014-02	0.4	2016-06	1.0	1.0.11 (June 10, 2017; 9 years ago) [±]
i.Scribe / InScribe	1999	1.00	?	?	2.3.18 (March 30, 2021; 5 years ago) [±]
HCL Notes (formerly IBM Lotus Notes)	1989	1.0	1989	1.0	14.0.0 7 December 2023
IMP	?	?	1998	1.0	6.2.27 27 August 2020
K-9 Mail	?	?	?	?	20.0 23 June 2026
KMail	1998-10	Alpha	1999-02	1.0.17	24.11.90 27 November 2024
Mailbird	2013-04-01	Public Beta	?	?	2.9.29 (April 22, 2021; 5 years ago) [±]
Mailpile	2011-11				1.0.0rc6 (September 4, 2019; 7 years ago) [±]
Microsoft Entourage	?	?	?	?	2008 (12.3.6) (March 12, 2013; 13 years ago) [±]
Microsoft Office Outlook	1997	97	1997	97	Office 2024 (LTSC): 2408 (Build 17932.21056) / 13 October 2026; 22 days ago; Office 2021 (LTSC): 2108 (Build 14334.20974) / 13 October 2026; 22 days ago; Office 2019 (LTSC): 1808 (Build 10417.20207) / 13 October 2026; 22 days ago; Office 2024 (Retail): 2610 (Build 20527.20150) / 3 November 2026; 1 day ago; Office 2021 (Retail): 2609 (Build 20430.20182) / 13 October 2026; 22 days ago; Office 2019 (Retail): 2509 (Build 19231.20194) / 14 October 2025; 12 months ago
Mozilla Thunderbird	2003-07-28	0.1	2004-12-07	1.0	159.0 27 October 2026
Mulberry	1996-09-20	1.0	1996-09-20	1.0	4.0.8 (February 21, 2007; 19 years ago) [±]
Mutt	1995	?	?	?	2.4.3 9 October 2026
Netscape Messenger	?	?	?	?	7.2 (August 17, 2007; 19 years ago) [±]
Netscape Messenger 9	2007-11-15	9.0a1	discontinued	discontinued	2007-11-15
nmh / MH	1979	?	?	?	1.5 (June 11, 2012; 14 years ago) [±]
Opera Mail	1996-09	2.1b1	1996-12	2.1	1.0.1044 (February 16, 2016; 10 years ago) [±]
Outlook Express	1996	3.0	?	?	
Pegasus Mail	1990	?	1990	?	4.91 8 September 2025
Pine	1992-01-15	2.00	1992-01-15	2.00	4.64 28 September 2005
Pocomail	1999	?	?	?	4.8 build 4400 (April 6, 2009; 17 years ago) [±]
RoundCube	2006	0.1-rc1	2014-04-07	1.0.0	1.7.5 19 October 2026
SeaMonkey Mail & Newsgroups	2005-09-15	1.0a	2006-01-30	1.0	2.53.24 28 July 2026
SquirrelMail	1999-12	0.1	2001-01	1.0	
Sylpheed	2000-01	0.1.0	2004-12	1.0.0	3.7 31 January 2018
The Bat!	1997-03	1.0 Beta	1998-03	1.00 Build 1310	
Trojitá	2009-08	0.1	2012-12	0.3.90	
Turnpike	1996 (circa)	1.0	1996 (circa)	1.0	6.06 (May 23, 2006; 20 years ago) [±]
Vivaldi	2015-11-03	Beta 1	2022-06-09	1.0	
Windows Live Mail	2007-11-06	12	2007-11-06	12	2012 (v16.4.3528.0331) (November 4, 2014; 12 years ago) [±]
Windows Mail	?	?	?	?	2007-01-01
YAM	1995	1.0	1995	1.0	2.9p1 27 April 2016
Zimbra	2005-11	Beta	2006-03	3.5	8.6.0 (December 15, 2014; 11 years ago) [±]

== Operating system support ==
The operating systems on which the clients can run natively (without emulation).

Client	Microsoft Windows	macOS	Linux	BSD	Unix	DOS	Other
Alpine	Yes	Yes	Yes	Yes	Yes	No	No
Apple Mail	No	Included	No	No	No	No	No
Balsa	No	No	Yes	Yes	No	No	No
Becky! Internet Mail	Yes	No	No	No	No	No	No
Canary Mail	Yes	Yes	No	No	No	No	No
Citadel	No	Yes	Yes	Yes	Yes	No	No
Claws Mail	Yes	Yes	Yes	Yes	Yes	No	No
Courier	Yes	No	No	No	No	No	No
Elm	No	Yes	Yes	Yes	Yes	No	No
eM Client	Yes	Yes	No	No	No	No	No
EmailTray	Yes	No	No	No	No	No	No
Eudora	Yes	Yes	No	No	No	No	No
Evolution	No (Note: Development stopped in 2008)	No	Yes	Yes	Yes	No	No
Forté Agent	Yes	No	No	No	No	No	No
Geary	No	No	Yes	Yes	Yes	No	No
Gnus	Yes	Yes	Yes	Yes	Yes	Yes	No
GroupWise	Yes	Yes	Yes	Yes	No	No	No
Hiri	Yes	Yes	Yes	No	Yes	No	No
i.Scribe / InScribe	Yes	Yes	Yes	No	No	No	No
IBM Lotus Notes	Yes	Yes	Yes	No	Yes	No	No
IMP	Yes	Yes	Yes	Yes	Yes	No	No
KMail	No	Yes	Yes	Yes	Yes	No	No
Mailbird	Yes	Yes	No	No	No	No	No
Mailpile	Yes (Note: Packaging planned)	Yes	Yes	Yes (Note: Free Software project, source available.)	Yes	No (Note: Free Software porting tangible provided OS has web browser.)	No
mailx	No	No	Yes	Yes	Yes	No	No
Microsoft Entourage	No	Terminated (2008)	No	No	No	No	No
Microsoft Office Outlook	Yes	Yes	No	No	No	No	No
Mozilla Mail & Newsgroups	Terminated (1.7.13)					No	No
Mozilla Thunderbird	Yes	Yes	Yes	Yes	Yes	No	No
Mulberry	Yes	Yes	Yes	Yes	Yes	No	No
Mutt	Yes	Yes	Yes	Yes	Yes	Yes	No
Netscape Messenger	Terminated (4.80)					No	No
Netscape Messenger 9	Terminated (9.0a1)					No	No
nmh / MH	No	Yes	Yes	Yes	Yes	No	No
Opera Mail	Yes	Yes	Yes	Yes	?	No	No
Outlook Express	Included (up to XP)	No	No	No	No	No	No
Pegasus Mail	Yes	No	No	No	No	Yes	NetWare; NLM
Pine	Yes	Yes	Yes	Yes	Yes	Terminated (3.96)	No
Pocomail	Yes	No	No	No	No	No	No
RoundCube	Yes	Yes	Yes	Yes	Yes	No	No
SeaMonkey Mail & Newsgroups	Yes	Yes	Yes	Yes	Yes	No	No
SquirrelMail	Yes	Yes	Yes	Yes	Yes	No	No
Sylpheed	Yes	Yes	Yes	Yes	Yes	No	No
The Bat!	Yes	No	No	No	No	No	No
Trojitá	Yes	Yes	Yes	Yes	Yes	No	MeeGo
Turnpike	Yes	No	No	No	No	No	No
Vivaldi	Yes	Yes	Yes	Yes	Yes	No	No
Windows Live Mail	Yes	No	No	No	No	No	No
Windows Mail	Included (Vista)	No	No	No	No	No	No
YAM	No	No	No	No	No	No	AmigaOS; AROS; MorphOS
Zimbra	Yes	Yes	Yes	Yes	Yes	No	No
Client	Microsoft Windows	macOS	Linux	BSD	Unix	DOS	Other

== Protocol support ==
=== Communication and access protocol support ===
What email and related protocols and standards are supported by each client.

Client	POP3 fetch all messages (RFC 1939)	POP3 selected by filter (RFC 1939)	POP3 selected by user (RFC 1939)	IMAP4 (RFC 3501)	SMTP (RFC 5321)	NNTP (RFC 3977)	LDAP v2 (RFC 4511)	LDAP v3 (RFC 4511)	EWS	IPv6 (RFC 2460)	MAPI
Alpine	Yes	Yes	Yes	Yes	Yes	Yes	Yes	Yes	?	Yes	?
Apple Mail	Yes	Yes	Yes	Yes	Yes	?	Yes	Yes	?	Yes	?
Becky! Internet Mail	Yes	Yes	Yes	Yes	Yes	Yes (Note: Becky! requires FRNews or BkNews plugin installed for handling NNTP.)	Yes	?	?	?	?
Canary Mail	No	No	No	Yes	Yes	No	No	No	Yes	Yes	No
Citadel	Yes	?	?	Yes	Yes	?	?	?	?	?	?
Claws Mail	Yes	Yes	Yes	Yes	Yes	Yes	Yes	Yes	?	Yes	?
Courier	Yes	Yes	Yes	Yes	Yes	No	Yes	Yes	?	?	?
Elm	No	No	No	?	?	?	?	?	?	?	?
eM Client	Yes	Yes	Yes	Yes	Yes	No	No	No	Yes	Yes	No
EmailTray	Yes	No	No	Yes	Yes	No	No	No	No	No	No
Evolution	Yes	No	Yes	Yes	Yes	Yes	Yes	Yes	plug-in	?	plug-in
Gnus	Yes	Yes	Yes	Yes	Yes	Yes	Yes	Yes	No	Yes	Plug-in
GroupWise	Yes	Yes	Yes	Yes	Yes	Yes	Yes	Yes	No	Yes	Yes
Hiri	No	No	No	No	No	No	Yes	Yes	Yes	Yes	No
i.Scribe / InScribe	Yes	No	Yes	Yes	Yes	No	Yes (Note: i.Scribe / InScribe requires a plugin to handle LDAP.)	Yes	No	No	Yes
HCL Notes	Yes	Yes	Yes	Yes	Yes	Yes	Yes	Yes	No	Yes	No
KMail	Yes	Yes	Yes	Yes	Yes	No (Note: KDE supports Newsgroups (NNTP) by the use of KNode)	Yes	?	?	?	?
Mailbird	Yes	?	?	Yes	Yes	?	Yes	Yes	?	Yes	?
Mailpile	Yes	No	No	Yes	Yes	?	?	?	?	?	?
Microsoft Entourage	Yes	?	?	Yes	Yes	Yes	No	Yes	Partial	?	?
Microsoft Entourage 2008, Web Services Edition	Yes	?	?	Yes	Yes	?	?	Yes	Yes	?	?
Microsoft Office Outlook	Yes	No	No	Yes	Yes	No	Yes	?	Yes	Yes	Yes
Mozilla Mail & Newsgroups	Yes	?	?	?	?	Yes	?	?	?	?	?
Mozilla Thunderbird	Yes	No	No	Yes	Yes	Yes	Partial	Partial	Yes	Yes	Yes
Mulberry	Yes	No	No	Yes	Yes	No	Yes	?	?	Yes	Yes
Mutt	Yes	No (possible with POP3 browser)	No (possible with POP3 browser)	Yes	Yes	No (slrn looks alike)	Partial (resolve real names through NSS)	?	?	Yes	?
Netscape Messenger	Yes	?	?	Yes	?	Yes	?	?	?	?	?
Netscape Messenger 9	Yes	?	?	Yes	?	Yes	?	?	?	?	?
nmh / MH	Yes	?	?	No	Yes	?	?	?	No	?	No
Opera Mail	Yes	No	Yes	Yes	Yes	Yes	No	No	?	Yes	Yes
Outlook Express	Yes	No	No	Yes	Yes	Yes	Yes	?	No	?	No
Pegasus Mail	Yes	Yes	Yes	Yes	Yes	Yes (Note: Pegasus Mail can convert Newsgroup messages and/or RSS feeds to emails through the use of free add-ons.)	Yes	?	?	?	?
Pine	Yes	No	No	Yes	Yes	Yes	Yes	No	?	?	?
Pocomail	Yes	Yes	Yes	Yes	Yes	No	No	No	?	?	?
RoundCube	Yes	No	No	Yes	Yes	No	Yes	Yes	?	?	?
SeaMonkey Mail & Newsgroups	Yes	No	No	Yes	Yes	Yes	Partial	?	?	Yes	?
SquirrelMail	Yes	No	No	Yes	Yes	No	Yes	Yes	?	?	?
Sylpheed	Yes	Yes	Yes	Yes	Yes	Yes	Yes	No	No	Yes	No
The Bat!	Yes	Yes (Note: Selective Download filters can skip/delete messages on POP3 server based on header (sender, recipient, subject, etc) information, this doesn't require to retrieve the full message body from the server.)	Yes (Note: Message Dispatcher allows the user to decide which messages should be retrieved, deleted or skipped based on the header information (sender, recipient, subject, etc) displayed to the user.)	Yes	Yes	Yes (Note: The Bat! requires MyGate plugin installed for handling NNTP.)	Yes	No	No	Yes	Yes
Trojitá	No	No	No	Yes	Yes	No	No	No	No	Yes	No
Turnpike	Yes	?	?	?	Yes	Yes	?	?	?	?	?
Vivaldi	Yes	?	?	Yes	Yes	No	?	?	?	Yes	
Windows Live Mail	Yes	No	No	Yes	Yes	Yes	Yes	?	No	Yes	No
Windows Mail	Yes	No	No	Yes	Yes	?	?	?	No	Yes	No
YAM	Yes	Yes	Yes	No	Yes	No	No	No	?	?	?
Zimbra	Yes	No	No	Yes	Yes	No	Yes	Yes	?	?	?
Client	POP3 fetch all messages (RFC 1939)	POP3 selected by filter (RFC 1939)	POP3 selected by user (RFC 1939)	IMAP4 (RFC 3501)	SMTP (RFC 5321)	NNTP (RFC 3977)	LDAP v2 (RFC 4511)	LDAP v3 (RFC 4511)	EWS	IPv6 (RFC 2460)	MAPI

=== Integration protocol support ===
Client	IMSP ()	ACAP (RFC 2244)	RSS 0.91 Feeds	RSS 1.0 Feeds	RSS 2.0 Feeds	ATOM Feeds	iCalendar (RFC 5545)	MAPI/RPC	CalDAV (RFC 4791)	CardDAV (RFC 6352)
Alpine	?	?	?	?	?	?	?	?	?	?
Apple Mail	?	?	?	?	?	?	Yes	?	Yes	Yes
Becky! Internet Mail	?	?	Yes (Note: Becky! requires BkBlogReader or BkRSSviewer or B.F.R or BkRssReader plugin installed for handling RSS and ATOM.)	Yes	Yes	Yes	?	?	?	?
Canary Mail	No	No	No	No	No	No	No	No	No	No
Citadel	?	?	?	?	?	?	?	?	?	?
Claws Mail	?	?	No	Yes (Note: RSSyl plugin is required to read RSS and ATOM in Claws Mail.)	Yes	Yes	Yes (Note: vCalendar plugin is required to handle iCalendar in Claws Mail.)	?	?	?
Courier	No	No	No	No	No	No	No	?	?	?
Elm	?	?	?	?	?	?	?	?	?	?
eM Client	No	No	Yes	Yes	Yes	No	Yes	No	Yes	Yes
EmailTray	No	No	No	No	No	No	No	No	?	?
Eudora	No	Yes	No	No	No	No	No	?	?	?
Evolution	No	No	No (Note: The evolution-rss plugin (provided as a separate package by many distributions provides the RSS functionality in Evolution.)	No	No	No	Yes	Yes	Yes	Yes
Gnus	No	No	Yes	Yes	Yes	Yes	Yes	Yes	Yes	Yes
GroupWise	?	No	?	?	?	?	Yes	?	?	?
Hiri	No	No	No	No	No	No	No	No	No	No
i.Scribe / InScribe	No	No	No	No	No	No	No	Yes	?	?
IBM Lotus Notes	No	No	Yes (Note: Studio Blog Reader is one RSS reader application for IBM Lotus Notes. IBM Lotus Notes version 8.x introduced a native RSS reader.)	Yes	Yes	Yes	Yes	?	?	?
KMail	?	?	Yes (Note: KDE supports feeds by the use of Akregator)	Yes	Yes	Yes	Yes (Note: KDE supports iCal by the use of KOrganizer)	?	Yes	Yes
Mailpile	?	?	?	?	?	?	?	?	?	?
Microsoft Entourage	?	?	?	?	?	?	Yes	?	?	?
Microsoft Office Outlook	?	?	Yes (Note: Support of feeds is available in Microsoft Office Outlook 2007. Earlier versions require RSSPopper plug-in.)	Yes	Yes	Yes	Yes (Note: Microsoft Outlook support of iCalendar varies by version.)	Yes	No	No
Mozilla Mail & Newsgroups	?	?	?	?	?	?	?	?	?	?
Mozilla Thunderbird	No	No	Yes	Yes	Yes	Yes	Yes (Note: iCalendar is supported with an extension.)	Yes (Note: Mozilla Thunderbird only supports SimpleMAPI.)	Yes	Yes
Mulberry	Yes	Yes	No	No	No	No	Yes	?	Yes	?
Mutt	?	?	No	No	No	No	No	?	?	?
Netscape Messenger	?	?	?	?	?	?	?	?	?	?
Netscape Messenger 9	?	?	?	?	?	?	?	?	?	?
nmh / MH	?	?	?	?	?	?	?	?	?	?
Opera Mail	?	?	Yes	Yes	Yes	Yes	No	?	No	No
Outlook Express	?	?	No	No	No	No	No	?	No	No
Pegasus Mail	?	?	Yes	Yes	Yes	?	?	?	?	?
Pine	No	No	No	No	No	No	No	?	?	?
Pocomail	No	No	Yes	Yes	Yes	No	No	?	?	?
SeaMonkey Mail & Newsgroups	No	No	Yes	Yes	Yes	Yes	Yes	?	?	?
SquirrelMail	?	?	Yes	Yes	Yes	Yes	Yes	Yes	?	?
Sylpheed	No	No	No	No	No	No	No	No	?	?
The Bat!	No	No	Yes (Note: The Bat! versions prior to 6.3 required rss2mail or rss2pop3 plugin installed for handling RSS and ATOM. The Bat! versions 6.3 and later have built-in support for RSS.)	Yes	Yes	Yes	No	Yes	?	Yes
Trojitá	No	No	No	No	No	No	No	No	?	?
Turnpike	?	?	?	?	?	?	?	?	?	?
Windows Live Mail	?	?	Yes	Yes	Yes	Yes	No	?	?	?
Windows Mail	?	?	?	?	?	?	?	?	?	?
YAM	No	No	No	No	No	No	No	?	?	?
Zimbra	?	?	Yes	Yes	Yes	Yes	Yes	?	?	?
Client	IMSP ()	ACAP (RFC 2244)	RSS 0.91 Feeds	RSS 1.0 Feeds	RSS 2.0 Feeds	ATOM Feeds	iCalendar (RFC 5545)	MAPI/RPC	CalDAV (RFC 4791)	CardDAV (RFC 6352)

=== Authentication support ===
Client	Regular		MSN (NTLM) browser login	Compuserve (RPA)	MD5 APOP (Note: Description: RFC 1734)	CRAM-HMAC (Note: Description: RFC 2195)			DIGEST-MD5	SCRAM	with hardware token PKCS#11	Biometric	SMTP Auth (Note: Description: RFC 2554)	X.509 Client certificate	OAuth
Client	LOGIN	PLAIN	MSN (NTLM) browser login	Compuserve (RPA)	MD5 APOP	MD5	SHA1	RIPEMD	DIGEST-MD5	SCRAM	with hardware token PKCS#11	Biometric	SMTP Auth	X.509 Client certificate	OAuth
Alpine	Yes	Yes	No	No	No	Yes	No	No	No	?	No	No	Yes	No	?
Apple Mail	Yes	Yes	No	No	?	?	?	?	?	?	?	Yes	Yes	Yes	Yes (Note: Minimum Mac OS version 10.11. Minimum iOS version 11.)
Becky! Internet Mail	Yes	Yes	Yes	?	Yes	Yes	?	?	?	?	?	?	Yes	Yes	?
Canary Mail	Yes	Yes	No	No	No	Yes	No	No	Yes	Yes	No	Yes	Yes	No	Yes
Citadel	?	?	?	?	?	?	?	?	?	?	?	?	?	?	?
Claws Mail	Yes	Yes	?	?	Yes	Yes	?	?	Yes	Yes	No	?	Yes	No	Yes
Courier	Yes	Yes	Yes	No	Yes	Yes	Yes	No	Yes	?	No	No	Yes	Yes	?
Elm	?	?	?	?	?	?	?	?	?	?	?	?	?	?	?
eM Client	Yes	Yes	Yes	No	No	Yes	No	No	Yes	?	No	No	Yes	No	Yes
EmailTray	Yes	Yes	?	?	Yes	Yes	Yes	No	?	?	No	No	Yes	No	?
Eudora	Yes	Yes	Yes	Yes	Yes	Yes	No	No	No	?	No	No	No	?	?
Evolution	Yes	Yes	Yes	No	Yes	Yes	No	No	Yes	?	No	No	Yes	No	Yes
Gnus	Yes	Yes	?	?	Yes	Yes	Yes	?	Yes	?	?	?	Yes	?	?
GroupWise	?	?	?	?	?	?	?	?	?	?	?	?	?	?	?
Hiri	Yes	Yes	Yes	No	No	No	No	No	No	?	No	No	No	No	Yes
i.Scribe / InScribe	Yes	Yes	Yes	No	Yes	No	No	No	No	?	No	No	Yes	No	Yes
IBM Lotus Notes	Yes	?	Yes	No	No	No	?	?	?	?	Yes	No	Yes	?	?
KMail	Yes	Yes	Yes	No	Yes	Yes	No	No	Yes	?	No	No	Yes	Yes	?
Mailpile	?	?	?	?	?	?	?	?	?	?	?	?	?	?	?
Microsoft Entourage	Yes	No	Yes	?	?	Yes	?	?	?	?	Yes	?	Yes	Yes	?
Microsoft Office Outlook	Yes	No	Yes	No	No	No	No	No	No	?	No	No	Yes	No	?
Mozilla Mail & Newsgroups	Yes	?	?	Yes	?	Yes	?	?	?	?	?	?	?	?	?
Mozilla Thunderbird	Yes	Yes	Yes	No	Yes	Yes	No	No	No	?	Yes	No	Yes	Yes	Yes
Mulberry	Yes	Yes	Yes	No	No	Yes	No	No	Yes	?	No	No	Yes	Yes	?
Mutt	Yes	Yes	Yes	?	Yes	Yes	No	No	Yes	?	No	No	1.5.15	Yes	1.10.1
Netscape Messenger	?	?	?	?	?	?	?	?	?	?	?	?	?	?	?
Netscape Messenger 9	?	?	?	?	?	?	?	?	?	?	?	?	?	?	?
nmh / MH	?	?	?	?	?	?	?	?	?	?	?	?	?	?	?
Opera Mail	Yes	Yes	No	No	Yes	Yes	No	?	?	?	No	No	Yes	Yes	?
Outlook Express	Yes	No	Yes	No	No	No	No	No	No	?	No	No	Yes	No	?
Pegasus Mail	Yes	?	No	No	Yes	No	No	No	No	?	No	No	Yes	Yes	?
Pine	Yes	Yes	No	No	No	Yes	No	No	No	?	No	No	Yes	No	?
Pocomail	?	?	?	?	?	?	?	?	?	?	?	?	?	?	?
RoundCube	Yes	Yes	?	?	Yes	Yes	Yes	?	Yes	?	Yes	?	Yes	?	?
SeaMonkey Mail & Newsgroups	Yes	Yes	Yes	No	Yes	Yes	No	No	No	?	Yes	No	Yes	Yes	?
SquirrelMail	Yes	Yes	?	?	Yes	Yes	Yes	?	Yes	?	Yes	?	Yes	?	?
Sylpheed	Yes	Yes	No	No	Yes	Yes	No	No	No	?	No	No	Yes	No	No
The Bat!	Yes	Yes	Yes	Yes	Yes	Yes	No	No	No	?	Yes (Note: Professional Edition.)	Yes	Yes	No	Yes
Trojitá	Yes	No	No	No	No	No	No	No	No	?	No	No	Yes	No	?
Turnpike	?	?	?	?	?	?	?	?	?	?	?	?	?	?	?
Windows Live Mail	Yes	No	Yes	No	Yes	No	No	No	No	?	No	No	No	No	No
Windows Mail	?	?	?	?	?	?	?	?	?	?	?	?	?	?	Yes (Note: Windows 10 required.)
YAM	Yes	Yes	?	?	Yes	Yes	?	?	?	?	?	?	Yes	AmiSSL	?
Zimbra	Yes	Yes	?	?	Yes	Yes	?	?	?	?	Yes	?	Yes (Note: Zimbra Desktop supports SMTP auth, not sure about collaboration suite)	?	?
Client	Regular		MSN (NTLM) browser login	Compuserve (RPA)	MD5 APOP	CRAM-HMAC			DIGEST-MD5	SCRAM	with hardware token PKCS#11	Biometric	SMTP Auth	SSL/TLS Client Certificate	OAUTH
Client	LOGIN	PLAIN	MSN (NTLM) browser login	Compuserve (RPA)	MD5 APOP	MD5	SHA1	RIPEMD	DIGEST-MD5	SCRAM	with hardware token PKCS#11	Biometric	SMTP Auth	SSL/TLS Client Certificate	OAUTH

=== SSL and TLS support ===
Client	Secure POP3		Secure IMAP4		Secure SMTP		Secure NNTP		Secure LDAP		SNI	OCSP (Note: Online Certificate Status Protocol - Description: RFC 2560)	CRL (Note: Certificate revocation list - Description: RFC 3280)
Client	SSL	TLS (Note: Description: RFC 2595)	SSL	TLS	SSL	TLS (Note: Description: RFC 2487)	SSL	TLS	SSL	TLS	SNI	OCSP	CRL
Alpine	Yes	Yes	Yes	Yes	Yes	Yes	Yes	Yes	?	Yes	?	?	?
Apple Mail	Yes	Yes	Yes	Yes	Yes	Yes	?	?	?	?	?	?	?
Becky! Internet Mail	Yes	Yes	Yes	Yes	Yes	Yes	?	?	?	?	?	?	?
Canary Mail	No	No	Yes	Yes	Yes	Yes	No	No	No	No	No	No	No
Citadel	?	?	?	?	?	?	?	?	?	?	?	?	?
Claws Mail	Yes	Yes	Yes	Yes	Yes	Yes	Yes	Yes	Yes	Yes	?	?	Yes
Courier	No	No	No	No	No	No	No	No	No	No	No	No	No
Elm	?	?	?	?	?	?	?	?	?	?	?	?	?
eM Client	Yes	Yes	Yes	Yes	Yes	Yes	No	No	No	No	?	No	Yes
EmailTray	Yes	Yes	Yes	Yes	Yes	Yes	No	No	No	No	?	No	No
Eudora	Yes	Yes	Yes	Yes	Yes	Yes	No	No	Yes	Yes	?	?	?
Evolution	Yes	Yes	Yes	Yes	Yes	Yes	Yes	Yes	Yes	Yes	?	No	No
Gnus	Yes	Yes	Yes	Yes	Yes	Yes	Yes	Yes	?	?	?	?	?
GroupWise	?	?	?	?	?	?	?	?	?	?	?	?	?
Hiri	No	No	No	No	No	No	No	No	No	No	No	No	No
i.Scribe / InScribe	Yes	Yes	Yes	No	Yes	Yes	No	No	No	No	?	No	No
IBM Lotus Notes	Yes	Yes	Yes	?	Yes	Yes	Yes	?	Yes	?	?	Yes	Yes
KMail	Yes	Yes	Yes	Yes	Yes	Yes	No	No	?	?	?	?	?
Mailpile	?	Yes	?	Yes	?	?	?	?	?	?	?	?	?
Microsoft Entourage	Yes	?	Yes	?	Yes	?	Yes	?	Yes	?	?	?	?
Microsoft Office Outlook	Yes	No	Yes	Yes	Yes	Yes	?	?	?	?	?	?	?
Mozilla Mail & Newsgroups	?	?	?	?	?	?	?	?	?	?	?	?	?
Mozilla Thunderbird	Yes	Yes	Yes	Yes	Yes	Yes	Yes	Yes	Yes	No	Yes	Yes	Yes
Mulberry	Yes	Yes	Yes	Yes	Yes	Yes	No	No	Yes	Yes	?	?	?
Mutt	Yes	Yes	Yes	Yes	1.5.15	1.5.15	?	?	?	?	?	?	?
Netscape Messenger	?	?	?	?	?	?	?	?	?	?	?	?	?
Netscape Messenger 9	?	?	?	?	?	?	?	?	?	?	?	?	?
nmh / MH	?	?	?	?	?	?	?	?	?	?	?	?	?
Opera Mail	Yes	Partial (Note: Opera Mail does not support STARTTLS command on special ports, like 995 for pop3 connection)	Yes	Partial	Yes	Partial	Yes	No	—N/a	—N/a	?	Yes	Yes
Outlook Express	Yes	Yes	Yes	Yes	Yes	Yes	?	?	?	?	?	?	?
Pegasus Mail	Yes	Yes	Yes	Yes	Yes	Yes	?	?	Yes	?	?	?	?
Pine	Yes	Yes	Yes	Yes	Yes	Yes	Yes	Yes	No	No	?	?	?
Pocomail	?	?	?	?	?	?	?	?	?	?	?	?	?
RoundCube	Yes	Yes	Yes	Yes	Yes	Yes	No	No	Yes	Yes	?	?	?
SeaMonkey Mail & Newsgroups	Yes	Yes	Yes	Yes	Yes	Yes	Yes	Yes	Yes	Yes	Yes	Yes	Yes
SquirrelMail	Yes	Yes	Yes	Yes	Yes	Yes	No	No	Yes	Yes	?	?	?
Sylpheed	Yes	Yes	Yes	Yes	Yes	Yes	Yes	Yes	?	?	?	?	?
The Bat!	Yes	Yes	Yes	Yes	Yes	Yes	No	No	No	No	Yes	Yes (Note: Since version 4.2, The Bat! supports two modes of X.509 certificate handling: Internal Implementation and via Microsoft CryptoAPI. CRLs and OCSP are only supported in the latter mode during TLS connections.)	Yes
Trojitá	?	?	Yes	Yes	Yes	Yes	?	?	?	?	?	Yes (system)	Yes (system)
Turnpike	?	?	?	?	?	?	?	?	?	?	?	?	?
Windows Live Mail	Yes	No	Yes	No	Yes	No	?	?	?	?	?	?	?
Windows Mail	Yes	No	Yes	?	Yes	?	?	?	?	?	?	?	?
YAM	Yes	Yes	No	No	?	?	?	?	?	?	?	?	?
Zimbra	Yes	Yes	Yes	Yes	Yes	Yes	Yes	Yes	Yes	Yes	?	?	?
Client	Secure POP3		Secure IMAP4		Secure SMTP		Secure NNTP		Secure LDAP		SNI	OCSP	CRL
Client	SSL	TLS	SSL	TLS	SSL	TLS	SSL	TLS	SSL	TLS	SNI	OCSP	CRL

== Features ==
Information on what features each of the clients support.

=== General features ===
For all of these clients, the concept of "HTML support" does not mean that they can process the full range of HTML that a web browser can handle. Almost all email readers limit HTML features, either for security reasons, or because of the nature of the interface. CSS and JavaScript can be especially problematic.

Client	HTML email	UTF-8 support	Image blocking	Junk filtering		Phishing filtering	Thread view	Conversation view	PGP support		S/MIME support			
Client	HTML email	UTF-8 support	Image blocking	local	server- side	Phishing filtering	Thread view	Conversation view	inline	PGP/MIME or OpenPGP	protocol	OCSP	CRL	certificates on tokens, smartcards support
Alpine	Read only	Yes	Yes	?	?	?	Yes	?	Yes	?	Yes	?	?	?
Apple Mail	Yes	Yes	Yes	Yes	Yes	?	Yes	Yes	No	No	Yes	Yes	Yes	No
Becky! Internet Mail	Yes	Yes	Yes	No	No	No	Yes	No	Yes	?	Yes	?	?	?
Canary Mail	Yes	Yes	Yes	?	Yes	?	Yes	Yes	Yes	Yes	No	No	No	No
Citadel	Yes	Yes	No	Yes (Note: Citadel plugs Mail into SpamAssassin)	?	?	No	?	?	?	?	?	?	
Claws Mail	Read-only	Yes	Yes	Yes	Yes	Yes	Yes	?	Yes	Yes	Yes	?	Yes	Yes
Courier	Yes	No	No	Yes	Yes	?	No	?	?	?	?	?	?	?
Elm	?	?	?	?	?	?	?	?	?	?	?	?	?	?
eM Client	Yes	Yes	Yes	Yes	Yes	Yes	No	Yes	Yes	Yes	Yes	No	Yes	Yes
EmailTray	Yes	Yes	Yes	No	Yes	?	No	No	No	No	No	No	No	No
Eudora	Yes	No	Yes	Pro only	Pro only	?	Yes	No	Yes (Note: Eudora requires a plugin to handle PGP.)	Yes	Yes	?	?	?
Evolution	Yes	Yes	Yes	Yes	?	No	Yes	No	Yes	Yes	Yes	?	?	?
Gnus	Yes	Yes	Yes	Yes	Yes	?	Yes	?	Yes	Yes	Yes	?	?	Yes
GroupWise	Yes	Yes	Yes	Yes	?	?	Yes	?	?	?	?	?	?	?
Hiri	Yes	Yes	Yes	Yes	Yes	?	Yes	Yes	Yes	No	No	No	No	No
i.Scribe / InScribe	Read-only	Yes	Yes	Yes	No	?	Yes	?	Yes	No	No	No	No	No
HCL Notes	Yes	Yes	Yes	Yes	Yes	Yes	Yes (Note: First release 6.0 (September 2003), enhancements introduced in release 7.0 (August 2005))	?	Yes	Yes (4.1.2+)	Yes	Yes	Yes	Yes
KMail	Yes	Yes	Yes	Yes	?	?	Yes	Yes	Yes (with GPG)	Yes (1.5+, with GPGME)	Yes	Yes	Yes	?
Mailbird	Yes	Yes	Yes	Yes	Yes	Yes	Yes	Yes	?	No	No	No	No	No
Mailpile	?	Yes	?	?	?	?	?	Yes	?	Yes	?	?	?	?
Microsoft Entourage	Yes	Yes	Yes	Yes	Yes	Yes	?	?	?	Yes	Yes	?	?	Yes
Microsoft Office Outlook	Yes	Yes	Yes	Yes	Yes	Yes	Yes	Yes (2010+)	No	No	Yes	?	Yes	Yes
Mozilla Mail & Newsgroups	?	?	?	?	?	?	?	?	?	?	?	?	?	?
Mozilla Thunderbird	Yes	Yes (Note: Although Thunderbird supports UTF-8, its handling of line wraps causes problems with long lines of text that don't contain spaces, which essentially makes it unusable for certain languages (e.g. Chinese, Japanese, Korean))	Yes	Yes	Yes	Yes (Note: Mozilla Thunderbird adds this feature in Thunderbird 1.5.0.4)	Yes	Yes	Yes (Note: Using PGP in Thunderbird before version 78 requires Enigmail.)	Yes	Yes	Yes	?	Yes
Mulberry	Yes	Yes	Yes	No	Yes	?	Yes	?	Yes (Note: PGP/GPG and S/MIME support require a free (included) plugin.)	Yes	Yes	?	?	?
Mutt	Read-only	Yes	Yes (no support for images)	Yes	?	?	Yes	Yes	Yes	Yes	Yes	?	Yes (with GPGME)	?
Netscape Messenger	?	?	?	?	?	?	?	?	?	?	?	?	?	?
Netscape Messenger 9	?	?	?	?	?	?	?	?	?	?	?	?	?	?
nmh / MH	?	?	?	?	?	?	?	?	?	?	?	?	?	?
Opera Mail	Yes	Yes	Yes	Yes	Yes	No	Yes	No	No	No	No	No	No	No
Outlook Express	Yes	Yes	Yes	No	?	?	Yes	?	Yes (Note: Using PGP in Outlook Express requires a plugin.)	No (Note: Outlook Express does not display PGP/MIME signed messages.)	Yes	?	?	?
Pegasus Mail	Yes	Yes	Yes	Yes	Yes	Yes	Yes	?	Yes	Yes (sending is broken)	?	No	No	No
Pine	Read-only	Yes	Yes	No	?	?	Yes	?	Yes (with Pine Privacy Guard)	No	Yes	?	?	?
Pocomail	Yes	Yes	Yes	Yes	Yes	?	?	?	?	?	?	?	?	?
RoundCube	Yes	Yes	Yes	Yes	Yes	Yes (depends on antivirus)	Yes	?	?	Yes	Yes	?	?	?
SeaMonkey Mail & Newsgroups	Yes	Yes	Yes	Yes	?	Yes	Yes	?	Yes	Yes	Yes	Yes	?	Yes
SquirrelMail	Yes	Yes	Yes	Yes	Yes	Yes (depends on antivirus)	Yes	?	?	Yes	Yes	?	?	?
Sylpheed	No (Note: Sylpheed has some limited ability to show HTML email. It can show the plain text that's left after stripping away all the HTML tags. Sylpheed has no ability to compose HTML.)	Yes	Yes	Yes	?	?	Yes	?	No	Yes	?	?	?	?
The Bat!	Yes	Yes	Yes (Note: The Bat is not able to display inline images.)	Yes	Yes	?	Yes	?	Yes	Yes	Yes	Partial (Note: The Bat! supports two modes of S/MIME: Internal Implementation and via Microsoft CryptoAPI. CRLs and OCSP are only supported in the latter mode. Internal implementation only supports Aladdin eToken Pro or Rainbow iKey1000 tokens and can import certificates (from PKCS#12/PFX format) which were created outside The Bat!. CryptoAPI supports any kind of tokens and smart cards which have a corresponding Cryptographic Service Provider installed.)	Partial	Yes
Trojitá	Read only	Yes	Yes	No	Yes	No	Yes	Yes	No	Read only	Read only	Read only	Read only	Read only
Turnpike	Read-only	?	?	?	?	?	?	?	?	?	?	?	?	?
Windows Live Mail	Yes	Yes	Yes	Yes	Yes	Yes	Yes	Yes	Yes	?	Yes	?	?	?
Windows Mail	Yes	Yes	?	Yes	?	?	?	?	?	?	?	?	?	?
YAM	?	Yes	?	Yes	?	?	No	No	Yes	?	?	?	?	?
Zimbra	Yes	Yes	Yes	Yes	Yes	Yes (depends on antivirus)	Yes	?	?	No	?	?	?	
Client	HTML email	UTF-8 support	Image blocking	Junk filtering		Phishing filtering	Thread view	Conversation view	PGP support		S/MIME support			
Client	HTML email	UTF-8 support	Image blocking	local	server- side	Phishing filtering	Thread view	Conversation view	inline	PGP/MIME or OpenPGP	protocol	OCSP	CRL	certificates on tokens, smartcards support

=== Messages features ===
Client	Label messages				Reformat received messages		Bi-directional text support	Composing messages			Native images preview					Postpone/scheduled message sending	Native documents preview						
Client	with colors	with flag	antidelete	add note	edit headers (e.g., Subject)	forced recode (Note: It's a frequent problem for people dealing with Cyrillic/Russian in email messages that the message is not encoded in the encoding declared in its headers and thus can't be read. With such a message (with a wrong declaration of the encoding), it well might be the case that it passed through several incorrect recoding stages while it was being sent and delivered; thus it's not possible to correctly render it and read it if one uses the common type of the interface for choosing the encoding (such as the menu in Mozilla Firefox). An example of such a complex case of a wrongly declared encoding: a message was entered through a webform in the windows-1251 encoding, but the web interface incorrectly assumed that it was in latin-1; based on this assumption, it performed the recoding from latin-1 to utf-8. The result of this operation cannot be correctly decoded through the common encoding-selection interface; it can only be decoded through a two-stage recoding: first from utf-8 to latin-1, then from windows-1251 to utf-8 (assuming that one works in a Unicode environment). After it is decoded, it is desirable to store it in the recoded form instead of the original, in order to be able to read it easily afterwards, and to quote it for replies.)	Bi-directional text support	Spell checking	Signatures	Bottom-posts replies	jpeg	gif	bmp	png	others	Postpone/scheduled message sending	txt	pdf	doc	xls	odt	ods	others
Alpine	Yes	Yes	?	?	?	?	?	Yes	Yes	?	?	?	?	?	?	Yes	Yes	?	?	?	?	?	?
Becky! Internet Mail	Yes	Yes	?	Yes	Yes	Yes	?	Yes	Yes	Yes	Yes	Yes	Yes	Yes	?	?	?	?	?	?	?	?	?
Canary Mail	?	?	No	No	No	No	Yes	Yes	Yes	Yes	Yes	Yes	Yes	Yes	Yes	No	Yes	Yes	Yes	Yes	Yes	No	Yes
Citadel	?	?	?	?	?	?	?	?	?	?	?	?	?	?	?	?	?	?	?	?	?	?	?
Claws Mail	Yes	Yes	Yes	No	Yes	Yes	Yes	Yes	Yes	Yes	Yes	Yes	Yes	Yes	?	Yes	Yes	with a plugin	?	?	?	?	?
Courier	Yes	Yes	No	No	Yes	?	?	Yes	Yes	?	No	No	No	No	No	Yes	?	No	No	No	No	No	?
Elm	?	?	?	?	?	?	?	?	?	?	?	?	?	?	?	?	?	?	?	?	?	?	?
eM Client	Yes	Yes	No	Yes	Yes	No	Yes	Yes	Yes	No	Yes	Yes	Yes	Yes	Yes	Yes	?	Yes	?	?	?	?	?
EmailTray	Yes	No	No	No	No	No	?	Yes	Yes	Yes	Yes	Yes	Yes	Yes	?	No	Yes	Yes	Yes	Yes	No	No	?
Eudora	Yes	Yes	No	No	Yes	?	?	Yes	Yes	?	Yes	Yes	Yes	Yes	QuickTime	Yes	?	?	?	?	?	?	?
Evolution	Yes	Yes	?	?	No	?	Yes	Yes	Yes	?	Yes	Yes	Yes	Yes	?	?	?	?	?	?	?	?	?
Gnus	Yes	Yes	Yes	?	?	?	?	Yes	Yes	Yes	Yes	Yes	Yes	Yes	XPM	Yes	?	?	?	?	?	?	?
GroupWise	Yes	Yes	Yes	Yes	Yes	?	?	Yes	Yes	Yes	Yes	Yes	Yes	Yes	?	Yes	Yes	Yes	Yes	Yes	Yes	Yes	?
Hiri	Yes	Yes	No	Yes	No	No	No	Yes	No	Yes	Yes	Yes	Yes	Yes	Yes	No	No	No	No	No	No	No	No
i.Scribe / InScribe	Yes	No	No	Yes	No	No	No	Yes (Note: i.Scribe / InScribe supports full integration with GNU Aspell, which is its requirement for spell checking.)	Yes	Yes	Yes (Note: i.Scribe / InScribe requires libjpeg.)	Yes	Yes	Yes (Note: i.Scribe / InScribe requires libpng.)	ICO, TIFF	Yes	No	No	No	No	No	No	No
HCL Notes	Yes	Yes	?	?	Yes	?	?	Yes	Yes	?	Yes	Yes	Yes	No	CGM, Lotus PIC, PCX, TIFF	?	Yes	Yes	Yes	Yes	?	?	?
KMail	Yes	Yes	No	Yes	?	?	?	Yes	Yes	?	Yes	Yes	Yes	Yes	?	?	?	?	?	?	?	?	?
Mailbird	Yes	Yes	?	Yes	?	?	?	Yes	Yes	Yes	Yes	Yes	Yes	Yes	?	Yes	Yes	Yes	Yes	Yes	No	No	?
Mailpile	?	?	?	?	?	?	?	?	?	?	?	?	?	?	?	?	?	?	?	?	?	?	?
Microsoft Entourage	Yes	Yes	?	Yes (Note: Entourage can link a message to a note.)	?	?	?	Yes	Yes	?	Yes	Yes	?	Yes	?	?	?	Yes	?	?	?	?	?
Microsoft Office Outlook	Yes	Yes	No	Yes	Yes	?	?	Yes	Yes	No	Yes	Yes	Yes	Yes	?	Yes	Yes	with a plugin	Yes	Yes	2010	2010	PowerPoint
Mozilla Mail & Newsgroups	?	?	?	?	?	?	?	?	?	?	?	?	?	?	?	?	?	?	?	?	?	?	?
Mozilla Thunderbird	Yes	Yes	?	?	with a plugin	?	?	Yes	Yes	Yes (Note: Configurable to start replies at top or bottom, with separate configuration of signature position)	Yes	Yes	Yes	Yes	ICO	Yes (Note: Thunderbird requires SL8TR extension.)	Yes	Yes	No	No	No	No	No
Mulberry	?	Yes	?	?	?	?	?	Yes	Yes	?	No	No	No	No	No	?	?	?	?	?	?	?	?
Mutt	Yes	Yes	No	No	Yes	?	?	Yes	Yes	?	No	No	No	No	No	postpone	?	?	?	?	?	?	?
Netscape Messenger	?	?	?	?	?	?	?	?	?	?	?	?	?	?	?	?	?	?	?	?	?	?	?
Netscape Messenger 9	?	?	?	?	?	?	?	?	?	?	?	?	?	?	?	?	?	?	?	?	?	?	?
nmh / MH	?	?	?	?	?	?	?	?	?	?	?	?	?	?	?	?	?	?	?	?	?	?	?
Opera Mail	Yes	Yes	No	No	?	?	Yes	Yes	Yes	?	Yes	Yes	Yes	Yes	APNG, ICO, SVG, WBMP, XBM, WebP	No	No	No	No	No	No	No	No
Outlook Express	No	Yes	No	No	?	?	?	Yes	Yes	?	Yes	Yes	Yes	Yes	ICO, art	?	?	?	?	?	?	?	?
Pegasus Mail	Yes	Yes	Yes	Yes	in index	No	No	Yes	Yes	No (Note: Starts replies with cursor at top, but is configurable regarding whether to include a blank space at the top for replies or not; some interleaved-posting users prefer starting the cursor at the top so they can trim the quotes)	Yes	Yes	Yes	Yes	TIFF	—N/a	Yes	No	No	No	No	No	RTF, HTML
Pine	Yes	Yes	?	?	No	with a patch (Note: The recoding engine and interface extensions that would solve the described recoding problems have been developed as a patch for Pine; it is to be found in the package pine-4.58L-alt4.src.rpm Archived 2011-08-27 at the Wayback Machine(ftp) for ALTLinux (under the name pine-4.58L-alt2-0.4.1.diff). Its essential feature is to enable to forcibly recode messages, save them in the recoded form, and quote in replies.)	?	Yes (Note: Pine supports full integration with GNU Aspell or other external speller, which is its requirement for spell checking.)	Yes	?	No	No	No	No	No	?	?	?	?	?	?	?	?
Pocomail	Yes	Yes	?	Yes	?	?	?	Yes	Yes	?	Yes	Yes	Yes	Yes	?	?	?	?	?	?	?	?	?
RoundCube	Yes	Yes	Yes	Yes	?	?	Yes	Yes	Yes	?	Yes	Yes	Yes	Yes	?	?	Yes	Yes	Yes	Yes	Yes	Yes	?
SeaMonkey Mail & Newsgroups	Yes	Yes	No	No	?	?	?	Yes	Yes	?	Yes	Yes	Yes	Yes	?	?	?	?	?	?	?	?	?
SquirrelMail	Yes	Yes	Yes	Yes	?	?	Yes	Yes	Yes	?	Yes	Yes	Yes	Yes	?	?	Yes	Yes	Yes	Yes	Yes	Yes	?
Sylpheed	Yes	Yes	No	No	?	?	?	Yes	Yes	?	Yes	Yes	Yes	Yes	?	?	Yes	No	No	No	No	No	?
The Bat!	Yes	Yes	Yes	Yes	No	No	No	Yes	Yes	Yes	Yes	Yes	Yes	Yes	ICO, emf	Yes	Yes	No	No	No	No	No	No
Trojitá	No	Yes	?	?	No	No	Yes	No	Yes	Yes	Yes	Yes	Yes	Yes	Yes	Yes	Yes	No	No	No	No	No	Yes
Turnpike	Yes	?	?	No	?	?	?	Yes	Yes	?	Yes	Yes	Yes	No	?	?	?	?	?	?	?	?	?
Windows Live Mail	No	Yes	No	No	?	?	?	Yes	Yes	?	Yes	Yes	Yes	Yes	?	?	?	?	?	?	?	?	?
Windows Mail	?	?	?	?	?	?	?	?	?	?	?	?	?	?	?	?	?	?	?	?	?	?	?
YAM	No	No	No	No	No	No	No	Yes	Yes	Yes	Yes	Yes	Yes	Yes	Yes	Yes	Yes	Yes	Yes	Yes	Yes	Yes	Yes
Zimbra	Yes	Yes	Yes	Yes	?	?	?	Yes	Yes	?	Yes	Yes	Yes	Yes	?	?	?	?	?	?	?	?	?
Client	Label messages				Reformat received messages		Bi-directional text support	Composing messages			Native images preview					Postpone/scheduled message sending	Native documents preview						
Client	with colors	with flag	antidelete	add note	edit headers (e.g., Subject)	forced recode	Bi-directional text support	Spell checking	Signatures	Bottom-posts replies	jpeg	gif	bmp	png	others	Postpone/scheduled message sending	txt	pdf	doc	xls	odt	ods	others

=== Database, folders and customization ===
Client	Message file format	Encrypted database	Virtual folders	Scheduled backup	New mail notification				Customizable interface	Customizable keybindings	Fragmented messages (Note: Fragmented messages make it possible, for example, to send a large audio message as several partial messages, and still have it appear to the recipient as a simple audio message rather than as an encapsulated message containing an audio message. RFC 2046)	Database search with regular expressions support	Indexed search	Search folders (Note: Search Folders are virtual folders that contain views of all email items matching specific search criteria. Search Folders display the results of previously defined search queries.)	IMAP	
Client	Message file format	Encrypted database	Virtual folders	Scheduled backup	ticker	tray icon	tooltip	sound	Customizable interface	Customizable keybindings	Fragmented messages	Database search with regular expressions support	Indexed search	Search folders	Search	IDLE
Alpine	mbox, mbx, MIX, maildir (with patches), MMDF, tenex, mtx, MH, mx, news, phile	?	Yes	Partial	?	?	?	Yes	Yes	No	?	No	Yes	Yes	Yes	No
Becky! Internet Mail	mbox	?	?	No	Yes	?	Yes	Yes	?	?	?	Yes	?	Yes	Yes	Yes
Canary Mail	Proprietary	Yes	No	No	?	Yes	?	Yes	Yes	Yes	No	No	Yes	Yes	Yes	Yes
Citadel	?	?	?	?	?	?	?	?	?	?	?	?	?	?	?	?
Claws Mail	MH, mbox (plugin)	No	No	No	Yes	Yes	Yes	Yes	Yes	Yes	?	?	?	No	Yes	No
Courier	Proprietary	Yes (weak)	Yes	?	?	?	?	?	Yes (layout)	No	?	No	No	Yes	No	Yes
Elm	?	?	?	?	?	?	?	?	?	?	?	?	?	?	?	?
eM Client	Proprietary (sqlite)	Yes	Yes	Yes	Yes	Yes	No	Yes	Yes	Yes	No	No	Yes	Yes	Yes	Yes
EmailTray	Proprietary	Yes	Yes	No	Yes	Yes	No	Yes	No	No	No	No	Yes	Yes	?	?
Eudora	modified mbox	No	Yes	No	No	Yes	Yes	Yes	Yes	Yes	Yes	Yes	Yes	Yes	Yes	?
Evolution	maildir, mbox, MH	No	Yes	No	No	Yes	Yes	Yes	Partial	Yes (Note: Editable keybindings is part of GNOME, provided "Editable menu accelerators" is enabled in GNOME's "Menus & Toolbars" control applet.)	Yes	Yes	Yes	Yes	Yes	Yes
Gnus	babyl, maildir, mbox, MMDF, news, rnews, SOUP, outlook, oe-dbx	No	Yes	No	No	?	?	?	Yes	Yes	Yes	Yes	Yes (Note: Via nnir backends such as Notmuch)	Yes	Yes	?
GroupWise	Proprietary	Yes	Yes	Yes	?	Yes	Yes	Yes	Yes	?	?	?	Yes	Yes	Yes	No
Hiri	Proprietary	No	No	No	No	No	No	No	Yes	No	No	No	Yes	Yes	No	No
IBM Notes	Proprietary	Yes	Yes	Yes	Yes	Yes	Yes	Yes	Yes	Yes	Yes (Note: Fragmented messages are called truncated document in Lotus Notes.)	No	Yes	Yes	?	No
KMail	mbox, maildir	No	Yes	No	?	?	?	?	Yes	Yes	No	Yes	?	Yes	Yes	Yes
Mailbird	Proprietary	No	Yes	No	Yes	Yes	Yes	Yes	Yes	Yes	No	Yes	Partial	Yes	Yes	Yes
Mailpile	?	?	?	?	?	?	?	?	?	?	?	?	?	?	?	?
Microsoft Entourage	Proprietary (Personal Storage Table)	?	Yes	Partial (Note: With Entourage 2008, you can use AppleScript and various internal/external scheduling mechanisms to create timed backups of Entourage Data.)	?	?	?	?	Partial	No	No	Partial (Note: With Entourage 2008 and later versions of 2004, you can use the Spotlight data to search what's in the Entourage database via regular expression in the file system in Terminal or via Spotlight's ...interesting...version of "regular expressions".)	Yes	Yes	Yes	Yes
Microsoft Office Outlook	Proprietary (Personal Storage Table)	Yes	Yes	Yes	?	Yes	Yes	Yes	Yes	Yes	?	?	Yes (Note: supported since Office 2007.)	Yes	?	Yes
Mozilla Mail & Newsgroups	mbox	?	?	?	?	?	?	?	?	?	?	?	?	?	?	?
Mozilla Thunderbird	mbox, maildir	No	Yes	?	?	Yes	Yes	Yes	Yes (Note: Thunderbird's interface can be user customized via the use of themes (which can reposition and skin controls))	?	No	?	Yes (as of 3.0)	Yes	Yes	Yes
Mulberry	mbox (Note: This is for Mulberry's 'offline browsing' capability, which is turned off by default. In the default configuration no local copy of the mail is created.)	Partial (Note: Mulberry is a dedicated IMAP client; If the IMAP server has these abilities, Mulberry can use them.)	Partial	Partial	?	?	?	?	Yes	?	?	Yes	Partial	No	Yes	No
Mutt	mbox, MMDF, MH, maildir	Yes (with compressed folders patch)	? (has limit command)	No	?	?	?	?	Yes	Yes	?	Yes	Yes (Note: Via Notmuch or other indexers.)	Yes	Yes	Yes
Netscape Messenger	mbox	?	?	?	?	?	?	?	?	?	?	?	?	?	?	?
Netscape Messenger 9	mbox	?	?	?	?	?	?	?	?	?	?	?	?	?	?	?
nmh / MH	MH	No	Yes	No	No	?	?	?	Yes	Yes	?	Yes	Yes	Yes	No	?
Opera Mail	mbox, MH, Proprietary	No	Yes (all folders are virtual)	No	No	Yes	Yes	Yes	Yes	Yes	No	Yes	Yes	Yes	?	Yes
Outlook Express	Proprietary	No	No	No	?	Yes	No	Yes	No	No	Yes	?	No	?	?	Yes
Pegasus Mail	Proprietary (mbox-like)	No	Yes	No	?	Yes	Yes	Yes	Yes	?	?	Yes	?	Yes	Yes	No
Pine	mbox, mbx, MIX, maildir (with patches), MMDF, tenex, mtx, MH, mx, news, phile	?	?	?	?	?	?	?	?	?	?	?	?	?	?	No
Pocomail	mbox	Yes	Yes	Yes	?	?	?	?	Yes	?	?	Yes	Yes	Yes	?	?
RoundCube	[IMAP Server]	?	?	?	Yes	No	No	Yes	Yes	Yes	?	?	?	Yes	Yes	?
i.Scribe / InScribe	Proprietary (sqlite)	No	No	No	No	Yes	No	Yes	Yes	No	No	No	No	No	No	Yes
SeaMonkey Mail & Newsgroups	mbox	?	?	?	Yes	Yes	Yes	Yes	?	?	?	?	?	?	Yes	Yes
SquirrelMail	[IMAP Server]	?	?	?	Yes	No	No	Yes	Yes	Yes	?	?	?	Yes	Yes	?
Sylpheed	MH	No	Yes	No	?	Yes	?	?	Yes	Yes	No	No (Note: Because MH stores each letter in a separate file, it is trivially easy to (externally) search them with grep. This ease is shattered when non-raw encodings are used, such as base64.)	No	Yes	?	No
The Bat!	Proprietary	Yes (AES 128 bit) (with Pro and Voyager version) (Note: The Bat! Pro support two methods access to program when database is encrypted: password authorization and token authorization; Voyager support only password authorization and encrypted database is default and only available storage method.)	Yes	Yes	Yes	Yes	No	Yes	Yes	Yes	Yes	Yes (PCRE 6.2)	No	Yes	Yes	Yes
Trojitá	IMAP	No	No	No	No	Yes	No	No	Yes	Yes	No	No	Yes	No	Yes	Yes
Turnpike	Proprietary	Yes	Yes	?	?	?	?	?	?	?	Yes	?	?	Yes	?	?
Windows Live Mail	File System (.eml)	No	No	No	No	Yes	?	Yes	Yes	No	Yes	No	Yes	Yes	?	?
Windows Mail	?	?	?	?	?	?	?	Yes	?	?	?	?	?	?	?	Yes
YAM	mbox, maildir, oe-dbx	No	No	No	?	?	Yes	Yes	Yes	No	No	No	No	No	No	No
Zimbra	File system	No	Yes	Yes	?	?	?	?	Yes	Yes	Yes	Yes	Yes	Yes	Yes	Yes
Client	Message file format	Encrypted database	Virtual folders	Scheduled backup	New mail notification				Customizable interface	Customizable keybindings	Fragmented messages	Database search with regular expressions support	Indexed search	Search folders	IMAP	
Client	Message file format	Encrypted database	Virtual folders	Scheduled backup	ticker	tray icon	tooltip	sound	Customizable interface	Customizable keybindings	Fragmented messages	Database search with regular expressions support	Indexed search	Search folders	Search	IDLE

=== Templates, scripts and programming languages ===
Client	Message templates						Message templates individual for	Support in message templates scripts, programming languages						
Client	new	reply	forward	read confirmation	save	print	Message templates individual for	JavaScript	VBScript	PHP Scripts	Python	Regular expressions	Java	Other (specify)
Alpine	Yes	Yes	Yes	?	?	?	Any	No	No	No	No	?	No	?
Becky! Internet Mail	Yes	Yes	Yes	Yes	Yes	Yes	Any account folder	?	?	?	?	?	?	
Canary Mail	Yes	Yes	Yes	Yes	Yes	Yes	?	No	No	No	No	No	No	*
Citadel	?	?	?	?	?	?	?	?	?	?	?	?	?	?
Claws Mail	Yes	Yes	Yes	Yes	Yes	Yes	account folder	No	No	No	Yes	?	?	Perl
Courier	Yes	Yes	Yes	No	Yes	Yes	?	No	No	No	No	No	No	No
Elm	?	?	?	?	?	?	?	?	?	?	?	?	?	?
eM Client	Yes	Yes	Yes	Yes	Yes	Yes	account	No	No	No	No	No	No	No
Eudora	Yes	Yes	Yes	Yes	Yes	Yes	Any	No	No	No	No	Yes	No	No
Evolution	Yes	Yes	Yes	Yes	Yes	Yes	?	?	?	?	?	?	?	?
Gnus	Yes	Yes	Yes	Yes	Yes	Yes	?	No	No	No	No	Yes	No	elisp
GroupWise	Yes	No	No	Yes	Yes	?	?	?	?	?	?	?	?	?
Hiri	Yes	Yes	Yes	No	Yes	Yes	Any	No	No	No	No	No	No	No
i.Scribe / InScribe	Yes	Yes	Yes	No	No	No	Any	No	No	No	No	No	No	Internal macros (similar to JavaScript)
IBM Notes	Yes	Yes	Yes	Yes	?	?	?	Yes	No	No	No	Yes	Yes	LotusScript, Formula language
KMail	Yes	Yes	Yes	No	No	No	none	?	No	No	No	?	?	?
Mailpile	?	?	?	?	?	?	?	?	?	?	?	?	?	?
Microsoft Entourage	Yes	Yes	Yes	Yes	?	?	?	?	?	?	?	?	?	AppleScript, Automator
Microsoft Office Outlook	Yes	Yes	Yes	Yes	?	?	?	No	No	?	No	?	No	?
Mozilla Mail & Newsgroups	?	?	?	?	?	?	?	?	?	?	?	?	?	?
Mozilla Thunderbird	Yes	Yes (Note: Thunderbird supports HTML templates with "Stationery" add-on.)	Yes	Yes	Yes	Yes	profile	Yes	?	?	?	?	?	?
Mulberry	Yes	Yes	Yes	Yes	?	?	?	No	No	No	No	?	?	?
Mutt	Yes	Yes	Yes	No	?	?	Any	No	No	No	No	Yes	?	Internal macros
Netscape Messenger	?	?	?	?	?	?	?	?	?	?	?	?	?	?
Netscape Messenger 9	?	?	?	?	?	?	?	?	?	?	?	?	?	?
nmh / MH	?	?	?	?	?	?	?	?	?	?	?	?	?	?
Opera Mail	No	No	No	No	No	No	—N/a	No	No	No	No	No	No	No
Outlook Express	Yes	Yes	?	Yes	?	?	?	Yes	Yes	?	?	?	?	?
Pegasus Mail	Yes	Yes	Yes	Yes	?	?	?	?	?	?	?	?	?	?
Pine	Yes	Yes	Yes	?	?	?	Any	?	No	No	?	?	No	?
Pocomail	Yes	Yes	Yes	?	?	Yes	?	No	No	No	No	No	No	PocoScript
RoundCube	Yes	Yes	Yes	Yes	Yes	Yes	Yes	No	No	No	No	No	No	?
SeaMonkey Mail & Newsgroups	?	?	?	?	?	?	?	?	?	?	?	?	?	?
SquirrelMail	Yes	Yes	Yes	Yes	Yes	Yes	Yes	No	No	No	No	No	No	?
Sylpheed	Yes	Yes	Yes	?	?	?	?	No	No	No	No	No	?	?
The Bat!	Yes	Yes	Yes	Yes	Yes	Yes	account folder address book group contact	Yes (Note: The Bat! supports JavaScript in message templates with the JavaScript Macro plugin.)	Yes (Note: The Bat! supports VBScript in message templates with the XMP plugin.)	Yes (Note: The Bat! supports PHP in message templates with the XMP plugin.)	Yes (Note: The Bat! supports Python in message templates with the TBPyxie plugin.)	Yes	PCRE 6.2	Internal and plugins macros
Turnpike	?	?	?	?	?	?	?	?	?	?	?	?	?	?
Windows Live Mail	Yes (Note: Weak "stationery" system that only accept pages done with Word.)	Yes	?	Yes	?	?	?	Yes	No	?	?	?	?	?
Windows Mail	?	?	?	?	?	?	?	?	?	?	?	?	?	?
YAM	Yes	Yes	Yes	?	Yes	Yes	?	No	No	No	No	?	?	ARexx
Zimbra	Yes	Yes	Yes	Yes	Yes	Yes	Any	No	No	No	No	No	?	?
Client	Message templates						Message templates individual for	Support in message templates scripts, programming languages						
Client	new	reply	forward	read confirmation	save	print	Message templates individual for	JavaScript	VBScript	PHP Scripts	Python	Regular expressions	Java	Other (specify)

== Internationalization ==
The Bat! supports Email Address Internationalization (EAI).

As of October 2016, email clients supporting SMTPUTF8 included Outlook 2016, mail for iOS, and mail for Android.

== See also ==
- Comparison of feed aggregators
- Comparison of browser engines
- Comparison of mail servers
- Comparison of webmail providers
- List of personal information managers
- Unicode and email
- Webmail
