= Sylpheed =

Open-source email and news software

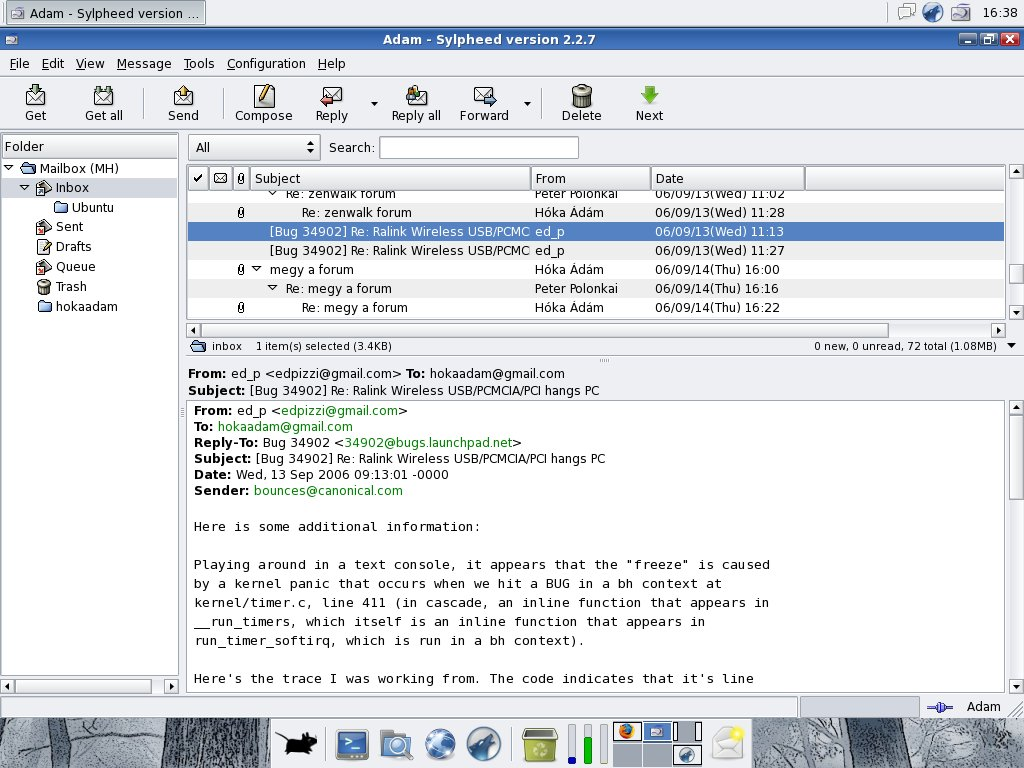
- Sylpheed 2.2.7 used together with Xfce Mailwatch plugin
- Developer: Yamamoto Hiroyuki
- Release: 0.1.0alpha (January 1, 2000; 26 years ago)
- Stable release: 3.7 / 31 January 2018
- Preview release: 3.8beta1 / 14 September 2022
- Written in: C, GTK+
- Operating system: BSD, Linux, macOS, Unix, Windows, AmigaOS
- Available in: English; Japanese
- Type: E-mail client, news client
- License: Sylpheed GPL-2.0-or-later; LibSylph LGPL-2.1-or-later
- Website: sylpheed.sraoss.jp/en/
- Repository: github.com/sylpheed-mail/sylpheed.git

Sylpheed is an open-source e-mail client and news client licensed under GNU GPL-2.0-or-later with the library part LibSylph under GNU LGPL-2.1-or-later. It provides easy configuration and an abundance of features. It stores mail in the MH Message Handling System. Sylpheed runs on Unix-like systems such as Linux or BSD, and it is also usable on Windows. It uses GTK+.

In 2005, Sylpheed was forked to create Sylpheed-Claws, now known as Claws Mail. As of 2020, both projects continue to be developed independently.

Sylpheed is the default mail client in Lubuntu, Damn Small Linux and some flavours of Puppy Linux.

== Features ==
=== Spam filtering ===
Sylpheed provides support for spam filtering using either bogofilter or bsfilter, at the user's choice. Bsfilter is shipped with the Windows version of Sylpheed.

=== Plug-ins ===
Sylpheed supports the development of plug-ins. As of February 2015, Sylpheed's website notes an attachment-tool plug-in, an automatic mail forwarding plug-in, and a plug-in for determining whether or not attachments are password-protected.

=== Limitations ===
Sylpheed is unable to send HTML mail. This is intentional, since the developers consider HTML mail to be harmful. It is still possible to receive HTML mail using Sylpheed.

=== Password ===
The password is stored in plaintext in the Sylpheed configuration file, which by default is only readable by "owner" and not by "group" nor "other". A feature called "master password" prevents Sylpheed from holding plaintext passwords, but does not protect stored messages from other local users with administrator privilege.

=== Encryption ===
Sylpheed includes natively PGP Sign and PGP Encrypt options in the compose window (which requires however an encryption tool based on PGP already installed on the computer). This function is simple to handle yet not intuitive to set up.

== See also ==
- Claws Mail
- List of Usenet newsreaders
- Comparison of Usenet newsreaders
- Comparison of e-mail clients
