= Hiri =

The word Hiri has several meanings:

- Hiri, a cross-platform desktop email-client
- Mount Hiri, a volcanic island north of Ternate in the Maluku Islands of Indonesia
- Hiri Motu, an official language of Papua New Guinea
- Hiri Rural LLG, a local-level government area in Papua New Guinea
- The Hiri trade cycle, a traditional trade-route in South East coastal New Guinea before European contact
