= Trojitá =

Free software e-mail client

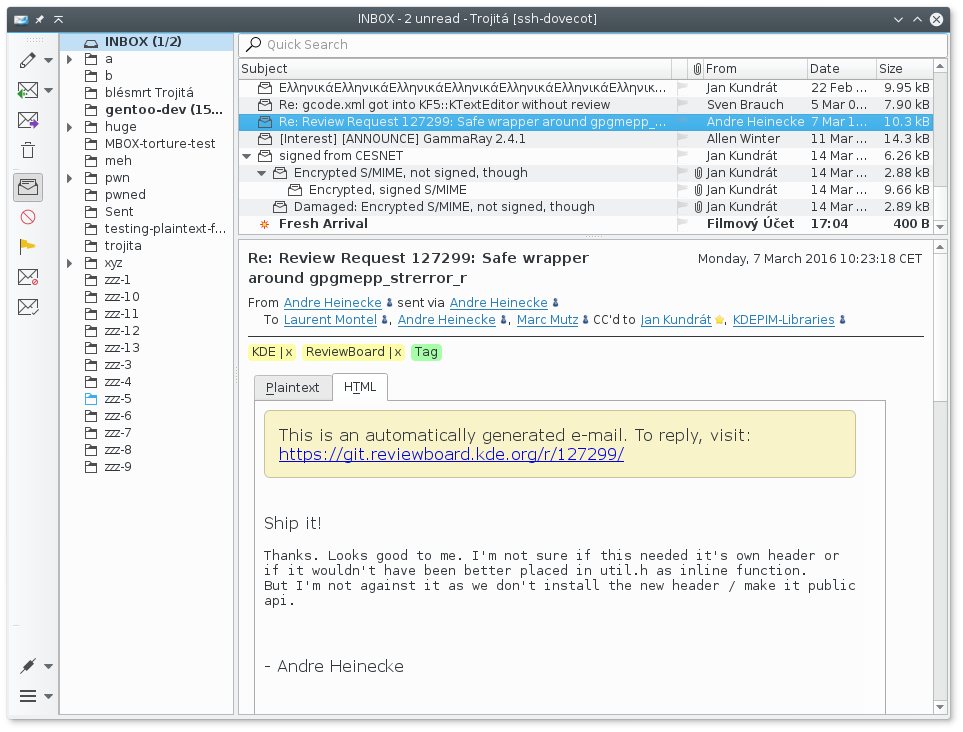
- Trojitá showing a list of e-mails
- Developer: KDE
- Release: August 31, 2009; 17 years ago
- Written in: C++, Qt
- Type: Email client
- License: GPL-2.0-only or GPL-3.0-only (Note: Or LicenseRef-KDE-Accepted-GPL: "Any later version accepted by the membership of KDE e.V. (or its successor approved by the membership of KDE e.V.), which shall act as a proxy defined in Section 14 of version 3 of the license.")
- Website: apps.kde.org/trojita/
- Repository: invent.kde.org/pim/trojita

Trojitá ([trɔjɪtaː]) is a free software IMAP and SMTP email client developed using the Qt C++ library. The design goals of the maintainers are to develop a fast e-mail client which respects open standards, is cross-platform and uses the available resources very efficiently.

Trojitá offers to manage contacts in the abook format, as introduced by the text-based user interface abook addressbook program.

In Autumn 2012, Trojitá became a part of the KDE community.

== History ==
In 2006, the project started as a private exercise in programming of Jan Kundrát. As a part of his studies, Trojitá became a topic of the author's bachelor and master's theses, making a debut in 2009. In 2010, Jan was briefly contracted to work on Trojitá for a system integrator, but the project was cancelled for external reasons. After Jan's graduation, the governance of the project opened up and Trojitá moved beneath the KDE umbrella. As a part of the KDE community, Trojitá gained new contributors and was translated into thirty-three languages.

Since 2012, Trojitá took part in two rounds each of Google Code-In as well as Google Summer of Code competitions. As of 2016, Trojitá includes contributions from more than sixty developers.

Trojitá is the e-mail engine used for mail synchronization within the xTuple's Postbooks ERP project. It was also planned to become the e-mail engine used in the Canonical's Ubuntu Touch mobile handsets until Canonical forked the code.
