= Claws Mail =

E-mail client software

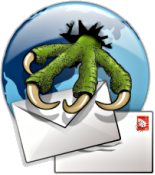

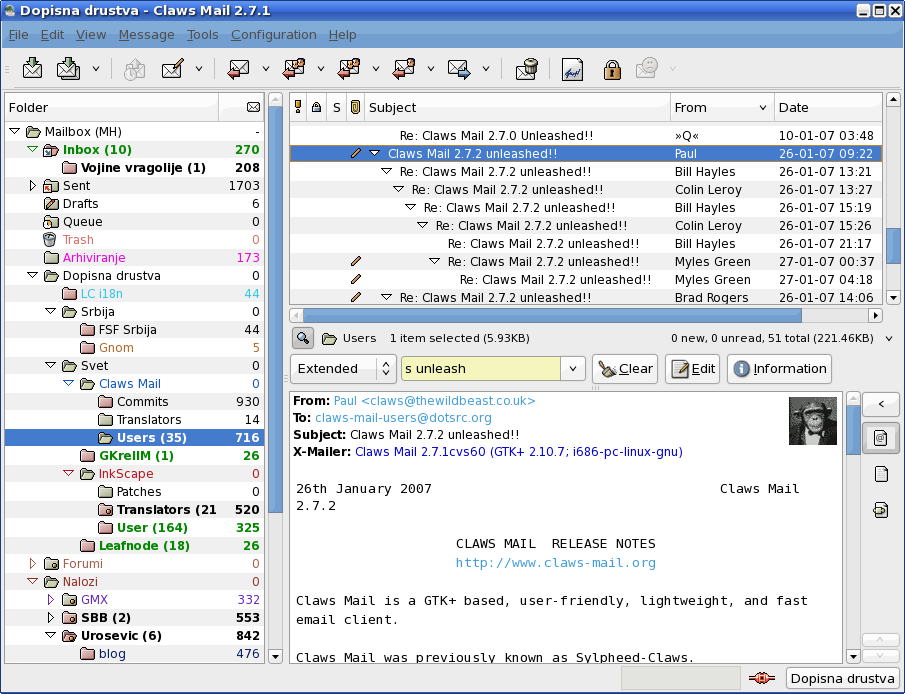
- Main window of Claws Mail 2.7.1
- Developer: The Claws Mail Team
- Initial release: May 11, 2001; 24 years ago
- Stable release: 4.3.1 / 24 February 2025
- Preview release: None [±]
- Repository: git.claws-mail.org?p=claws.git%3Ba%3Dsummary
- Written in: C (with GTK)
- Operating system: BSD, Linux, macOS, Solaris, Unix, Windows
- Type: E-mail client, news client
- License: GPL-3.0-or-later
- Website: www.claws-mail.org

Claws Mail is a free and open-source, C/GTK-based e-mail client, which is both lightweight and highly configurable. Claws Mail runs on both Windows and Unix-like systems such as Linux, BSD, and Solaris. It stores mail in the MH mailbox format. Plugins allow to read HTML mail, but there is none to compose HTML messages.

== Features ==
Claws Mail is also a news client and RSS aggregator. Further features – integrated or supplied via plugins – include:

- Search and filtering, optionally via Perl and Python scripting
- Security (GPG, SSL, anti-phishing)
- Anti-spam (SpamAssassin, Bogofilter)
- Per-folder preferences
- Optional external editor
- Templates for messages
- Themes support, customisable toolbars, X-Face support, foldable quotes
- Viewers for HTML mail (Dillo, Gtkhtml2, Fancy (WebKit), LiteHTML)
- TNEF attachment parser
- PDF viewer
- Various notification plugins, e. g. trayicon and LED handler
- Archiving, import/export from standard formats
- Support for Mbox mailbox format
- Calendaring with events as kind of messages

== History ==
Development started in April 2001 as Sylpheed-Claws off the development version of Sylpheed, where new features could be tested and debugged. In August 2005 Claws Mail forked completely from Sylpheed.

== See also ==
- List of Usenet newsreaders
- Comparison of Usenet newsreaders
- Comparison of email clients
- Comparison of feed aggregators
