= Mulberry (email client) =

Open-source email client

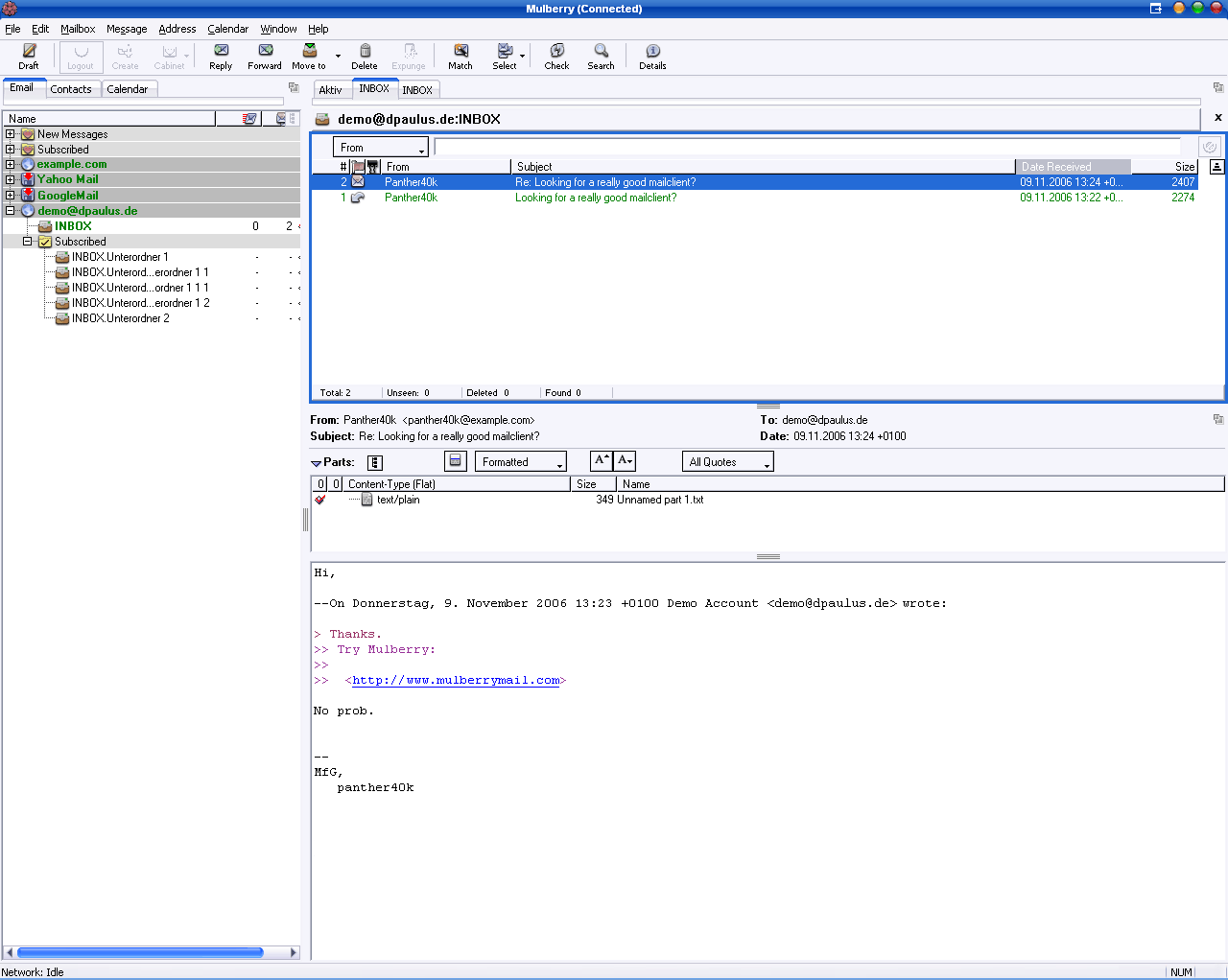
- Mulberry on Windows XP
- Original author: Cyrus Daboo
- Release: 1995; 31 years ago
- Stable release: 4.0.8 (February 21, 2007; 19 years ago) [±]
- Operating system: Windows, Linux, macOS, FreeBSD
- Type: Email client
- License: Apache License 2.0
- Website: mulberrymail.com
- Repository: trac.mulberrymail.com/mulberry/

Mulberry is an open-source email client marketed by Cyrusoft from approximately 1995 to 2005. On October 1, 2005, Cyrusoft International, Inc./ISAMET, declared Chapter 7 bankruptcy and went out of business. In August 2006, rights to the source code were acquired by Cyrus Daboo, the original author.

Originally developed for the Apple Macintosh, versions now exist for that platform as well as Microsoft Windows and Linux using the X window system. Mulberry's strengths include strict compliance with Internet standards such as IMAP, LDAP, IMSP, ACAP, and iCalendar, a unique GUI for defining Sieve (mail filtering language) scripts and support for IMAP disconnected operation. Its webmail counterpart, SilkyMail, provided similar IMAP functionality through a browser interface.

As of August 20, 2006, with version 4.0.5, Mulberry was made available at no cost, but remained proprietary. The most recent version, 4.0.8, was released for Macintosh (as a Universal Binary), Windows, and Linux on February 23, 2007. However, Cyrus Daboo made Mulberry available as open source on all three platforms on November 21, 2007, under the terms of the Apache License 2.0.
