= EmailTray =

Email client for Microsoft Windows

- Developer: Internet Promotion Agency S.A.
- Release: October 7, 2010; 16 years ago
- Stable release: 4.0 (July 2, 2012; 14 years ago) [±]
- Operating system: Windows
- Available in: English
- Type: E-mail client
- License: proprietary software
- Website: www.emailtray.com

EmailTray is a lightweight email client for the Microsoft Windows operating system. EmailTray was developed by Internet Promotion Agency S.A., a software development d.

EmailTray 2.0 was publicly released on October 7, 2010, as a free desktop email client. It supports multiple accounts using the standard POP3/SMTP or IMAP protocols, with or without SSL.

EmailTray combines features of a simple email client and an email notifier that alerts users to the new email messages that EmailTray considers important.

== History ==
EmailTray originated as SenderOK, an email productivity plug-in for Microsoft Outlook. The main features of SenderOK were email sorting and desktop notification about new prioritized email messages.

Apart from email sorting, the SenderOK plug-in also offered a social feature: the photo business cards of email senders were displayed along with their email messages. The business card information was retrieved from a proprietary social network hosted at SenderOK.com. In case an email sender had no SenderOK profile filled in, the SenderOK plug-in used information from the LinkedIn and Facebook social networks.

In October 2010, SenderOK was released as a standalone email client and was rebranded as EmailTray.

== Basic features ==
EmailTray is an email program that runs in the taskbar area of a Windows PC. The program goes active when a user gets new email messages that EmailTray considers important. At any time the program can be opened and used as a fully functional email client.

Protocols and Webmail services supported by EmailTray are: POP3, IMAP and SMTP, Yahoo! Mail, Gmail, Windows Live Hotmail and AOL Mail accounts. All passwords from user's email accounts are stored locally.

EmailTray lets users read and compose new messages in plain text or HTML, view attachments and attach files to messages. Users can also forward email messages, reply to emails and create an unlimited number of custom signatures that can be used in new messages and email replies.

EmailTray users can create custom rules based on the sender name and sender email address data, email subject contents and recipient data. An EmailTray user can set a sender's priority to Top Priority or Low Priority, assign colors to all messages that conform to a rule, or perform other actions like archiving or moving messages to the Spam folder.

To help users manage their emails, EmailTray provides the option to sort emails by date and email account, filter messages by sender and perform instant search through the emails of all tracked accounts.

== Advanced features ==
Being a simple email client, EmailTray does not offer an electronic calendar, address book, or feed reader options. EmailTray differs from other email clients mainly because of its email management features such as email sorting by priority, as well as alerts about new priority messages. The program offers password protection of the user's mail data.

Email sorting and prioritizing
EmailTray analyzes a user's email habits such as reading, replying, deleting or forwarding – to spot active conversations and give them the highest priority in the Inbox. Messages are then tagged as Top Priority, Low Priority, No Priority and Spam. This feature is similar to the Priority Inbox feature introduced in Gmail on August 30, 2010.

Priority mail notifications
EmailTray notifies its users with a popup alert and sound about new important mail that has arrived to the Top Priority folder. A user can manually change notification settings, e.g. set EmailTray to also notify about messages considered Low Priority, or change the reminder time interval, or use custom sounds for sound alerts.

Mail data password protection
Once a user installs EmailTray and creates a user account, he/she can protect their EmailTray software copy with a password. At adjustable time intervals, an opened EmailTray client can request a password for emails to be visible.

== System requirements ==
Operating System: Windows XP/Vista/7
Hardware: 1,2 GHz 32-bit (x86) or 64-bit (x64) processor; 512 MB RAM or greater; 100 MB hard drive space.
Supported browsers: IE 7.x and higher, Mozilla Firefox 3.x, Google Chrome 6.x, Flock 2.x
Supported Webmail services and protocols: Yahoo! Mail, Gmail, Windows Live Hotmail, AOL Mail, POP3 and IMAP.

== See also ==
- Comparison of email clients
