= The Bat! =

Email client for Windows

- Developer(s): Ritlabs, SRL
- Initial release: March 1997; 28 years ago (beta); March 1998; 27 years ago
- Written in: Delphi
- Operating system: Windows (XP and later)
- Size: 8 MB
- Available in: 18 languages
- Type: Email client, feed reader
- License: Shareware
- Website: www.ritlabs.com/en/products/thebat/

The Bat! is an email client for the Microsoft Windows operating system, developed by Moldovan software company Ritlabs. It is sold as shareware and offered in three editions: Home Edition, Professional Edition, and Voyager which is a portable version and is included with Professional Edition.

== Developers ==
Ritlabs, SRL is based in Chişinău, Moldova. It was founded as RIT Research Labs in 1992 by Sergey Demchenko and Slava Filimonov, and were the creators of the DOS Navigator file manager.

Alongside The Bat!, Ritlabs also offer a mail server software called BatPost.

== Features ==
=== Protocols and data security ===
The Bat! supports POP3 and IMAP alongside their SSL variants, and SMTP including secure STARTTLS connections. Microsoft Exchange Server is also supported via MAPI.

The internal PGP implementation based on OpenSSL lets users encrypt messages and sign them with digital signatures. Digital keys manager is included. PGP up to version 10.0.2 is supported. The Bat! supports S/MIME via Internal Implementation or Microsoft CryptoAPI, Secure Socket Layer (SSL) v3.0 / Transport Layer Security (TLS) v1.0, v1.1, and 1.2 (as of version 8.5) with AES algorithm.

The Bat! v9.1 supports TLS AEAD AES-GCM cipher suites for secure connections with mail servers. The Bat! v9.2.3 and subsequent ones unfortunately are not yet completely in compliance with the Google's security standards related to the OAuth 2.0 protocol.

The Bat! checks attached file extensions and blocks their launching if they are suspicious. The Bat! warns users of double extension attachments and allows users to see the real extension. The Bat!'s internal viewer was replaced in version 9.2.1 with the Chromium web browser rendering engine to ensure HTML formatting is properly rendered, prevent script execution, and provide anti-phishing information.

==== Database encryption ====
The Bat! Professional has the option to encrypt the message database, address books and configuration files stored on the computer. During the first program start, encryption can be activated and the master password can be set. The AES algorithm is used for encryption in the CBC process (Cipher Block Chaining) with a 128-bit key.

=== Message management ===
The Bat! provides virtual folders, advanced filtering, extensive search, a macro language, templates, tags, and color groups to assist in managing email.

Email templates contents may be dynamically changed through the use of macros, which can also be used to automatically execute other user-defined functions such as cursor positioning, addressing changes, identity changes, active account changes and other.

=== Filtering ===
A filtering system that sorts incoming, outgoing, read, and replied messages to folders; auto-responds; replies with custom templates; forwards, redirects, prints, or exports messages; sends read confirmations; runs external programs and more.

=== Language ===
Originally available in English, Russian, German, Polish and Dutch, the software interface has since been expanded to a total of 18 languages.

Support for IDNs that contain characters from non-Latin alphabets such as Arabic, Chinese, Cyrillic and Greek. IDN support includes Latin alphabet-based characters with diacritics, such as those found in French and German.

=== Import function ===
The Bat! enables email import from the following programs and file formats:

- UNIX mailbox format (mbox)
- Outlook Express v4.xx, 5.xx, 6.0
- Microsoft 365/Office Outlook
- Mozilla Thunderbird
- Netscape Communicator v4.xx
- Netscape Mail v2.xx, 3.xx
- Eudora Lite/Pro
- Pegasus Mail

Address books can be imported in the following formats:

- Outlook Express (Windows Address Book)
- Microsoft 365/Office Outlook (Contacts Folder)
- Google Contacts
- LDIF files
- Electronic business cards (Vcard)
- Comma-separated text files (CSV)
- Tab-delimited text files (TAB)
- Initialization files (INI)
- Eudora Address Book
- Pegasus Tag File
- CardDAV address books

=== RSS aggregator ===
Other than email, The Bat! also has a built-in feed reader using RSS.

=== Themes and customization ===
In November 2020, with release of version 9.3 The Bat! introduced a number of themes to change its look and feel, also providing the ability for further color changes to the themes as provided. Toolbars and menus may also be modified, although doing that is difficult and not well documented.

== Reception ==
The Bat! has gained popularity in some regions including Europe. Early reviews of The Bat! were largely positive: ZDNET in 1998 reviewed the first version and gave it 5 stars out of 5, saying "The Bat! is friendly, powerful, functional and easy to learn". Zonia Heath of Shareware Junkies called it "a very fast and effective email client". In 2000, TechByter.com also praised The Bat!, calling it an "exceptional piece of work" and noting the small 4 megabyte installation size.

PCMag reviewing The Bat! 2.0 in 2004 gave a negative review. In 2005, the website DonationCoder.com awarded The Bat! the "Best Email Client". Alphr praised the Professional version of The Bat! 3.6 with its security features. In 2011, Softpedia reviewed Professional version 5.0 and gave an "Excellent" rating of five out of five. PC World on the other hand gave the Professional version 2.5 stars out of five in 2012, commenting that it "fails to deliver".

GadgetSpeak.com gave The Bat! 8.0 four stars out of five in 2019.

== Version history ==
Major version	Initial release	Notes
1.0 Beta	March 1997	Supports folders, filtering, viewing HTML email without the need to have Internet Explorer installed, and international character sets. MailTicker feature.
1.00	March 1998	First stable version. Versions up to 1.31 was used the THtmlViewer layout engine by David Baldwin; 1.32 (27 April 2000) introduced a proprietary engine.
2.0	September 2003	Introduced IMAP support, a basic HTML editor, Anti-Spam and Anti-Virus Plug-ins and a Scheduler, and could import messages from Microsoft Office Outlook and Outlook Express.
3.0	September 2004	Introduced MAPI (Microsoft Exchange Server) support. IPv6 support added in v3.95 (December 2006).
4.0	7 February 2008	Text editor with Unicode support. Built-in image viewer.
5.0	6 April 2011	Improved IMAP protocol support. Quick reply feature and PGP v10 support added in v5.3.4 (December 2012).
6.0	14 November 2013	Full Unicode compatible. IDN support added. First 64-bit release. Support for RSS feeds, skype://, callto:// and tel:// protocols added in v6.3 (March 2014).
7.0	5 August 2015	CardDAV address book synchronization and Exchange Web Server (EWS) support.
8.0	27 November 2017	
9.0	27 November 2019	v9.2.3 is (not yet completely) in compliance with Google's security standards related to the OAuth 2.0 protocol for authentication with Gmail, Outlook and Yandex. Version 9.3.2 extended support to Office365.com and Live.com.
10.0	28 April 2022	
11.0	21 December 2023	Introduced the Conversation Thread View, a new feature that offers a swift summary of messages that share similarities. POP3 via OAuth is now working on Microsoft mail services in v11.3 (October 2024).

== See also ==
- Comparison of email clients
- Comparison of feed aggregators
