= Simeon (email client) =

Simeon was an IMAP4 email client by The Esys Corporation with support for IMSP and LDAP.

Simeon was available for several platforms, including Windows (3.x, 95 and NT), Macintosh (both 68k and PowerPC), and multiple Unix variants.

Although commended for its rich features as an early IMAP client, its difficult interface was regarded as more complex to use than POP-based mail clients. Lack of advanced filtering of mail and inability to easily manage multiple mail accounts (Simeon requires editing of configuration files) were also criticized.

Simeon was the default email client installed on Heriot-Watt University's IT infrastructure. It was also formerly used at the University of East Anglia.
