= Nylas Mail =

Desktop email client

Nylas N1
- Developer: Nylas
- Written in: Electron (software framework) (C++, JavaScript, etc.), React (JavaScript library)
- Operating system: Windows, Linux and OS X
- License: MIT
- Website: nylas.com/nylas-mail/
- Repository: github.com/nylas/nylas-mail

Nylas Mail is an open-source desktop email client by Nylas, known for its emphasis on user-contributed extensions. It was formerly known as Nylas N1 and was rebranded as Nylas Mail starting with the January 17, 2017 release.

Nylas discontinued Nylas Mail, ceased further development, and made the code available under the MIT License on September 6, 2017. One of the lead developers has continued development of the software on a fork named Mailspring.

== Features ==
Nylas Mail is compatible with multiple Gmail, Yahoo, Microsoft Exchange, and IMAP accounts, and is cross-platform on Linux, OS X, and Windows. The application accommodates user-written plugins. It has several layout styles in single or double panels, and has fullscreen and offline modes. By default, its mail sync functions are processed in a cloud owned by Nylas, the company responsible for the project. N1 added a unified inbox in February 2016 and PGP encryption support in June 2016.

== Reception ==
At the beginning of 2016, Macworld wrote that the software looked promising and had a better chance of enduring longer than past software—such as Sparrow and Mailbox—due to its open source license. The Next Web highly praised N1's extensions features and wrote that it could become for email what Google Chrome is to web browsing. N1 was the third most popular email desktop client among AppleInsider readers as of January 2016.

== See also ==
- Comparison of email clients
