= MH & xmh: Email for Users & Programmers =

Online guide for Unix email commands

MH & xmh: Email for Users & Programmers is the first book in history to have been published within the Internet.

The book was written by Jerry Peek and published online during the month of June, 1996, the contents are advice on how to use the email commands which are part of the MH mail program on Unix systems, including dealing with three interfaces xmh, exmh and mh-e, which is used within GNU Emacs.
