= Balsa (email client) =

Open source email client

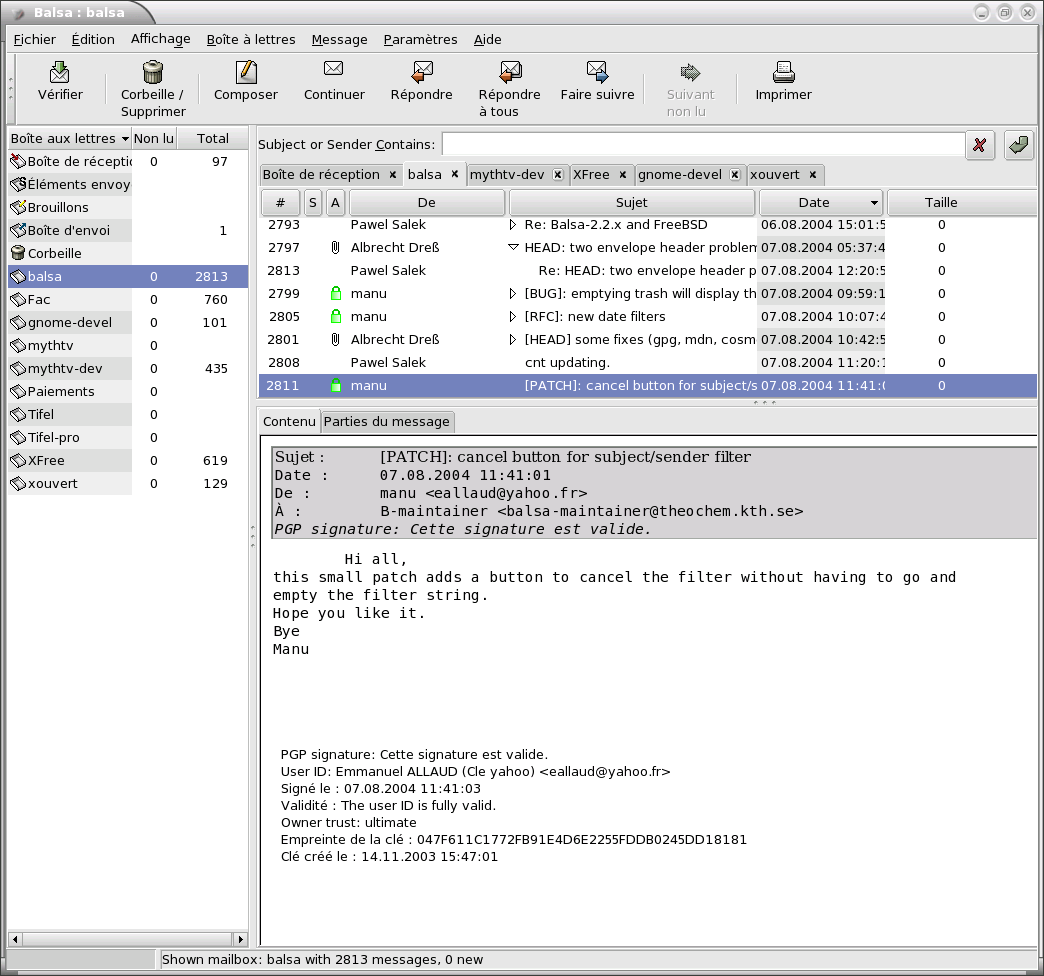
- Balsa displaying built-in GPG capabilities
- Stable release: 2.6.4 / 20 September 2022; 3 years ago
- Repository: gitlab.gnome.org/GNOME/balsa
- Written in: C
- Operating system: Linux
- Type: Email client
- License: GPL-2.0-or-later
- Website: pawsa.fedorapeople.org/balsa/

Balsa is a lightweight email client written in C for the GNOME desktop environment.

Balsa has a graphical front end, support for MIME attachments coming and going, directly supports POP3 and IMAP protocols. It has a spell checker and direct support for PGP and GPG for encryption. It has some basic filtering capabilities, and natively supports several email storage protocols. It also has some internationalization support, including Japanese fonts.

It builds on top of these other open source packages: GNOME, libtool, libESMTP, aspell, and gmime. It also can optionally use libgtkhtml for HTML rendering, libkrb5 for GSS-API, and openldap for LDAP functionality. It can optionally be configured to use gpg-error and gpgme libraries.

Balsa is packaged for a wide range of Linux distributions, including Arch Linux, Debian, Fedora, openSUSE, Slackware and Ubuntu, as well as for FreeBSD.

== See also ==
- Comparison of email clients
