= YAM (software) =

Email client for Amiga computers

YAM - Yet Another Mailer
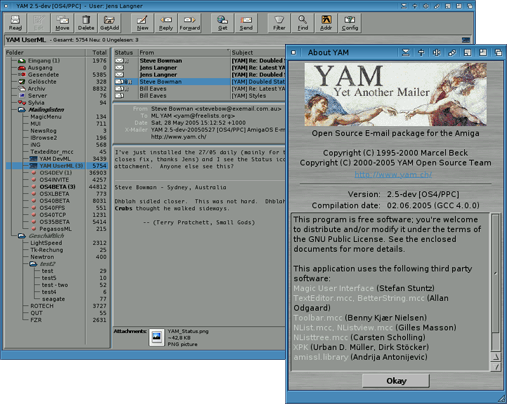
- Developer: YAM Open Source Team
- Release: 1995; 31 years ago
- Stable release: 2.9p1 / 27 April 2016
- Preview release: 2.10
- Operating system: AmigaOS (68k), AmigaOS 4 (PPC), MorphOS, AROS
- Type: E-mail client
- License: GPL-2.0-or-later
- Website: yam.ch
- Repository: github.com/jens-maus/yam

YAM (short for Yet Another Mailer) is a MIME-compliant E-mail client written for AmigaOS and derivative operating systems. Originally created by Marcel Beck, it currently supports multiple user accounts, encrypted communications via OpenSSL and PGP, unlimited hierarchical folders and filters, a configurable GUI based on MUI, extensive ARexx support for automating tasks, and most of the features to be expected in modern E-mail clients.

== History ==
The initial release from 1995 arrived when the Internet was still something very new for the average Amiga user. However, as time passed and further 1.x updates were released, YAM became quickly popular thanks to its simplicity and comprehensible user interface at a time when competing products were either German only (MicroDot), required a shareware fee (MicroDot-II) or used a less intuitive GUI in comparison, such as Thor.

The early YAM 1.x series, while very usable for the most part, was relatively basic and spartan in terms of functionality. It wasn't until 2.0 that finally the program started showing its full potential, featuring a major redesign of the user interface and a plethora of new features which turned it into the de facto standard Amiga E-mail client ever since.

Released in late 2000, YAM 2.2 was the last update from Marcel Beck, who ceased Amiga development but also released the sources under the GNU GPL-2.0-or-later. A group of Amiga developers then teamed up to coordinate and resume development, and finally in 2004 the first ever open source YAM (2.3) was released. During the next decade YAM managed to become a much more mature, stable and usable program. Along that time however, the developer team also lost most of its members, but YAM still remains today as one of the most iconic and popular pieces of Amiga software.

In February 2017, a development version of YAM 2.10 was publicly made available which was adapted to use AmiSSL v4 to give YAM up to date SSL support. This was further updated in July 2022, integrating AmiSSL v5 support and in March 2024 with a further SSL related improvement. Development of YAM 2.10 continues at the YAM Open Source Team's official repository, working towards a full public release, once remaining issues have been resolved.

In October 2024, AmigaKit Ltd released an own version of a fork of YAM using the GitHub published source code to create "YAM (68K/A600GS)". Their version 2.10 was released for their A600GS computer system. A few minor bugs were fixed to work around A600GS issues and the logo was refreshed. A subsequent maintenance release of version 2.10 was released by AmigaKit on 28 February 2025 for the A600GS and A1200NG computer systems. However, as AmigaKit did not release their changes to the public (either via GitHub or in a separate source code archive) there have been certain disputes on whether AmigaKit Ltd is actually violating the OpenSource GPL license terms YAM was originally released/maintained. In addition, even though they falsely assume that public YAM OpenSource development was stopped, they in fact never contacted the original authors or did start a public discussion on how to proceed with the slowed down YAM development.

== Recognition ==
At the peak of his popularity, and as a token of appreciation from the Amiga community at large, Marcel Beck received in 1998 the AAA Award International. The award presentation was held at the World of Amiga show in London, UK, and it was hosted by Amiga and Cloanto with the help of several Amiga user groups. Mr. Beck could not attend, but in a phone recording he stated that he felt very honored to receive the award, and thanked all YAM users around the world.

== See also ==
- Comparison of e-mail clients
