= Courier (email client) =

Courier (or Courier Email)
- Developer(s): RoseCitySoftware
- Final release: 3.5 (June 2004) [±]
- Preview release: 3.6 Beta (Windows) / March 3, 2008
- Operating system: Windows
- Type: Email client
- Website: rosecitysoftware.com/courier

Courier (also known as Courier Email) was an email client for Microsoft Windows. The software was originally released in 1996 as Calypso by Micro Computer Systems (MCS).

Courier supported the POP3, IMAP and SMTP protocols, provided several features for HTML security and allowed to use multiple e-mail accounts from one mailbox. Version 3.0 introduced html support and improved message security in comparison to version 2.0, however some features were not yet supported for html messages.

In 1998 the MCS introduced another Calypso branded product, Calypso Message Center, intended for tracking and distributing messages for corporate customers.

The company abandoned further development of Calypso, which was acquired in 2003 by RoseCitySoftware. This led to freeware release of version 3.3 and name change of the next shareware version 3.5 to Courier.

An upgrade path was negotiated with PocoSystems to add Courier-type features to Pocomail and direct Courier users to migrate to PocoMail 4.8 as a replacement for Courier 3.5. Free versions of the unfinished beta, requiring no registration, were available at the Yahoo Courier user group.

As of June 2021 the software is not available for download from official sources.
