= Becky! =

Email client

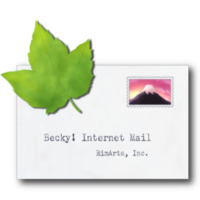
- Developer: RimArts
- Release: 1996
- Stable release: 2.83.03 / July 2, 2026; 10 days ago
- Written in: C++
- Operating system: Windows
- Available in: English, Japanese, French, German
- Type: e-mail client
- License: Shareware
- Website: RimArts

Becky! Internet Mail is an e-mail client software for Microsoft Windows developed by the Japanese company RimArts from Matsudo, Chiba. Becky! was originally released in 1996 as Becky! Version 1. That version was rewritten in the early 2000s and Becky! Version 2 was released in 2004 and is still the flagship product, receiving periodic updates.

Becky! achieved early success in East Asia due to good support for CJKV characters and its ability to handle many languages has created interest in Europe, as evidenced by the translations to French and German by volunteers. Volunteers also created an extended help file and administer the only support forum.

== Standards support ==
Becky! supports multiple accounts using the standard POP3/SMTP or IMAP protocols, with or without SSL, including the APOP security feature, and supports PGP encryption. Becky! also supports LDAP and CardDAV. Support for TLS 1.3 was added on October 1, 2019 with version 2.74.03, and support for Gmail OAuth2 released with version 2.75 on March 5, 2020.

== Features ==
Becky! provides full HTML messaging support for reading, composing, forwarding and redirecting messages, but defaults to plain text for composition. HTML mode can be selected via the editor on a message-by-message basis or templates can be defined for default or occasional use. This feature of templates can be customized at the account level, by folder, or for a specific topic. However, setting HTML as a default for composing messages is not an option.

Becky! provides a filtering manager for both outbound and inbound messages, allows date-dependent tasks to be assigned to messages, provides support for touch screens and the "toast" feature introduced with Windows 8, provides a mailing list manager and the ability to create portable versions of Becky!. Becky! also has support for a large number of plugins; one such plug-in offers Hotmail access, another offers Usenet newsgroups access.

A special feature is the Agent. Agents are tasks that can be assigned to any message to ensure a timely response or action. As the due date approaches, Becky! also updates the priority of the task.
