= Turnpike (software) =

Email and news client for Windows

Turnpike was a British-developed email and news client for Microsoft Windows, with an associated program for handling the Internet connection. The software, originally written by Chris Hall and Richard Clayton (who had previously been the co-founders and principal programmers of Locomotive Software), first appeared in 1995. It was acquired by Demon Internet later the same year and for a number of years was supplied to their customers free of charge (in a variant which would not work with other Internet service providers). In 1998, Demon Internet had over 180,000 subscribers. Many of these subscribers used Turnpike. It also had a small following of non-Demon users.

The suite consisted of two principal components, Connect, which interfaced with the modem driver or LAN, and Turnpike, which controlled, sorted and displayed news articles and email. The Connect window also provided telnet, finger, ping, and traceroute functions, call cost monitoring for dialup connections, and, in earlier versions and those upgraded therefrom, Ipswitch's WS_FTP. It had up to 20 buttons which linked to these functions and any other application the user chose to configure (by default including Internet Explorer). Prior to version 6 the Turnpike component was a stand-alone executable. From version 6 onwards it was implemented as a Windows Shell namespace extension. Mail filtering was done using Unix-like regular expressions. It used the Berkeley mailbox format for the export and import of email files.

== Compatibility ==
Versions 4 and beyond were 32-bit, and early versions of 5 included PGP. It works with Windows up to (as of 2016) Windows version 10, with the caveat that Turnpike version 6 (due to the shell namespace usage) only works with the 32-bit, not the 64-bit, variants of Windows 7 onwards (it works satisfactorily in virtual machines running 32-bit Windows hosted on machines running the 64-bit versions). Although no Linux port was produced, all versions worked satisfactorily under packages such as the proprietary Win4Lin. Versions up to and including 5 also worked quite well under Wine.

Versions 5 and 6 received the Good Netkeeping Seal of Approval in 2011.

Although Turnpike is no longer supported by its manufacturers (who have themselves been the subject of assorted takeovers, mergers, etcetera), there is still (2017) a reasonably active usenet newsgroup - demon.ip.support.turnpike, populated by knowledgeable users of the software. [As its name implies, the newsgroup was originally specific to Demon, but - like the microsoft.public.* hierarchy of newsgroups - it is now carried by many of the remaining news servers.]

The British Science Museum Group has among its collection a copy of an early version of the software in its original packaging.

== Recognition ==
Amongst its early reviews were those in the magazines Everyday Practical Electronics in November, 1995 and PC Format in Spring 1997. The Easy Net book by Keith Teare, published at the end of 1995, contained a brief review of version 1.03 of Turnpike, which had been released in July of that year.
