= Readdle =

Ukrainian mobile app company (e. 2007)

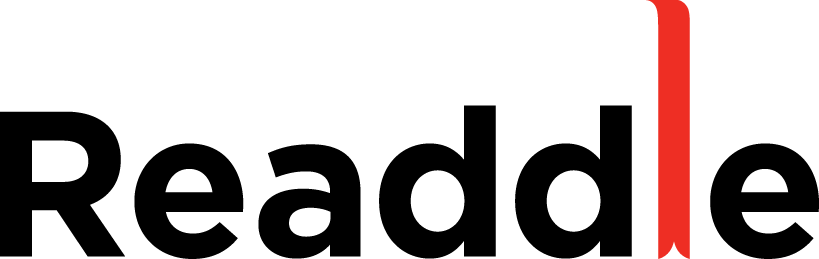
- Industry: Software
- Founded: 2007
- Founder: Igor Zhadanov
- Headquarters: Odesa, Ukraine
- Area served: Worldwide
- Key people: Igor Zhadanov (CEO)
- Products: PDF Expert, Spark, Scanner Pro, Calendars, Documents, Fluix
- Number of employees: 310 (2023)
- Website: readdle.com

Readdle is a Ukrainian software company that develops productivity software for email, document and PDF management, calendars, file management, and business workflows. Its core products are PDF Expert, Spark, Documents, Scanner Pro, Calendars and Fluix.

The company was founded in Odesa in 2007 and was an early developer of applications for the iPhone and Apple's App Store. Readdle has since expanded from its early focus on Apple devices to develop productivity software across multiple platforms. It employs more than 300 people in over 30 countries.

== History ==
Readdle was founded in 2007, in Odesa, Ukraine, by former college roommates Igor Zhadanov, Alex Tyagulsky, Andrian Budantsov, and Dmitry Protserov. The company is considered a global pioneer in iOS software development, having produced its inaugural web-based application to address file management on the iPhone prior to the launch of Apple's App Store.

In July 2014, the company opened its first physical office in San Francisco, California.

Following the 2014 Russian invasion of Ukraine, Readdle took steps to protect the viability of its operations, such as moving its data online, which has allowed the company to continue to operate throughout the conflict. Despite regular attacks on Odesa by Russian forces, Readdle maintains to keep its headquarters in its founding-city.

Following the Russian invasion of Ukraine in 2022, Readdle withdrew its applications from the Russian App Store and Google Play and said it would cease doing business with Russian companies and companies supporting the invasion.

In September 2023, Readdle opened a hub in London. The company already had international offices in Berlin, Lisbon and Gdańsk. At the time, Readdle employed more than 300 people and said it had retained all positions since the beginning of the full-scale Russian invasion while continuing to hire in Ukraine and internationally.

== Products ==
=== Documents ===
Documents
- Developer: Readdle Technologies Limited
- Release: 2008
- Operating system: iOS, iPadOS, macOS
- Website: https://readdle.com/documents

Documents (previously ReaddleDocs) is a file management application. The app was Readdle's first product, and was developed because co-founders Alex Tyagulsky and Andrian Budantsov wished to be able to read books on their iPhones. It was initially released as a Safari-based web service in 2007. Later, Apple asked Readdle to submit the app (then called ReaddleDocs) to become one of the 500 apps available on the App Store when it launched on July 10, 2008. After Wall Street Journal writer Walt Mossberg endorsed the app, sales increased ninefold, netting the company $500–1000 a week. In 2013, the app rebranded as Documents.

=== PDF Expert ===
PDF Expert
- Developer: Readdle
- Operating system: macOS, iOS
- Type: PDF editor
- Website: pdfexpert.com

PDF Expert is a PDF editing app for iPhone, iPad and Mac. The app allows a user to read, annotate and edit PDFs, change text and images, fill in forms and sign contracts.

PDF Expert was initially launched for iOS in 2010 for the first iPad and is now supported on the iPad, iPhone, and Mac.

Spark is an email application for Windows, iOS, macOS, and Android devices. Lifehacker wrote that Spark was the best alternative for Mailbox users when that service went offline. It was launched for iOS in May 2015. An Android version was released in April 2019, becoming Readdle's first application in Play Store.

==== Spark +AI ====
In 2023, Spark introduced artificial intelligence features for premium users. Dubbed 'Spark +AI', the service first launched by utilising Microsoft Azure OpenAI software to draft, rewrite, and contour emails on behalf of users. In 2024, Spark +AI continued to enhance its service by rolling out a new feature which supports AI content generation in the style of the end-user, allowing for more human-like/natural email construction.

== See also ==
- List of companies of Ukraine
- Science and technology in Ukraine
