= Pocomail =

Discontinued e-mail client for Microsoft Windows

- Developers: Poco Systems, RoseCitySoftware (for version 4.8)
- Initial release: 1999
- Final release: 4.8 build 4400 (April 6, 2009; 16 years ago) [±]
- Operating system: Windows 2000
- Available in: English
- Type: e-mail client
- Website: www.pocomail.com (dead)

Pocomail was an e-mail client for Microsoft Windows systems that was first developed by Poco Systems in 1999. It was originally designed to provide better spam and attack protection by using its own scripting methods (PocoScript) as opposed to using JavaScript and native Microsoft scripting.

Pocomail was awarded the PC Magazine Shareware Program of the Year in 2000 thanks to its intuitive use, support for POP3 and IMAP protocols, HTML viewing, and the ability to access multiple accounts from one simple application.

The most recent release, version 4.8 (released in April 2009) has added new features, such as the ability to edit sent and received messages, as part of a project with RoseCity Software to make PocoMail the planned upgrade path for Courier users. The added features were key strengths of the Courier email client. Pocomail also included a strong Bayesian filtering engine for preventing spam.

Pocomail had problems with displaying UTF-8 encoded characters.

Further development of the software has been discontinued as of December 2011.
