= IMSP =

IMSP is Internet Message Support Protocol. Defined in a 1995 Internet Draft, which carries this abstract:

The Internet Message Support Protocol (IMSP) is designed to support the provision of mail in a medium to large scale operation. It is intended to be used as a companion to the IMAP4 protocol IMAP4, providing services which are either outside the scope of mail access or which pertain to environments which must run more than one IMAP4 server in the same mail domain. The services that IMSP provides are extended mailbox management, configuration options, and address books.

Work on standardizing IMSP was never completed because it was superseded by the ACAP protocol, which provides a superset of IMSP's functionality.

== Implementations ==
- An IMSP server is available for download from CMU.
- The Horde PHP framework and applications have IMSP support.
- Mulberry supports IMSP storage of mail preferences and address books.
- Silkymail (discontinued) supported IMSP storage of mail preferences and address books. Address books were shared with Mulberry.
- Simeon (discontinued) supported IMSP storage of mail preferences and address books.
- An IMSP address book plugin is available for SquirrelMail.
