= EM Client =

Desktop and mobile email client

eM Client

- Developer: eM Client Inc.
- Release: November 21, 2007; 18 years ago
- Stable release: 10.1.5131.0 (February 13, 2025; 21 months ago) [±]
- Written in: C#
- Operating system: Microsoft Windows, macOS, iOS, Android
- Available in: 21 languages
- List of languages English, Czech, Danish, Dutch, German, Greek, Spanish, French, Hungarian, Italian, Korean, Japanese, Norwegian, Polish, Portuguese, Russian, Slovak, Swedish, Turkish, Ukrainian, Chinese.
- Type: Email client, Personal information manager, Productivity tool
- License: Freemium
- Website: www.emclient.com

eM Client is a desktop email client for Windows and macOS. Its functions include sending and receiving email, managing calendars, tasks, contacts, notes, and chat (both XMPP-based and multichat such as Slack and MS Teams). It was originally released in 2007 and still receives regular updates as of May 2024. Versions for Android and iOS were released in 2024.

== Features ==
eM Client has a range of features for handling email, including advanced rules management, mass mail, delayed send, or a built-in translator for incoming and outgoing messages. It supports signatures, Quick Text, and tagging and categorization for easy searching. Watch for Replies and Snooze Email functions are available, as well as direct cloud attachments from cloud services like Dropbox, Google Drive, OneDrive, ownCloud or Nextcloud.

eM Client provides also a lookup service for GnuPG public keys (eM Keybook) in order to more easily send encrypted communication via email, and generally simplify PGP encryption in email communication.

eM Client supports all major email platforms including Exchange, Gmail, Google Workspace, Office365, iCloud and any POP3, SMTP, IMAP or CalDAV server. Automatic setup works for Gmail, Exchange, Office 365, Outlook, iCloud, or other major email services. Following the shut down of IncrediMail, an auto-import option was added to transfer data from this platform to eM Client. Since version 8.2, eM Client supports online meetings via Zoom, Microsoft Teams, and Google Meet).

eM Client allows extensive appearance customization.

eM Client 10, released in 2024, also provides AI features for composing messages and replies, Inbox categories and Quick Actions which allow users to create their own macros.

== Acquisition of Postbox ==
On 22 October 2024 it was announced that eM Client had acquired Postbox, and that the Postbox email client was to be discontinued.
