= Scribe Mail =

Cross-platform e-mail client

Scribe
- Developer(s): Memecode
- Initial release: 1999; 26 years ago
- Operating system: Windows, Linux, Mac OS X
- Type: E-mail client
- License: GNU GPL
- Website: memecode.com/scribe/

Scribe is a portable and cross-platform e-mail client for Microsoft Windows, Linux and Mac OS X with some PIM functionality.

Originally released as freeware named i.Scribe in 1999, it was released and renamed as a commercial product InScribe in 2003. Both versions were developed from the same source. In 2022, the project was renamed to Scribe and its source code released under an open source license. the Version 2.0 of the software is slated to include a rewrite of the mail database back end.

Scribe uses the HTML layout engine from Lgi that is virus safe. Executable attachments are detected and optionally deleted. Translators have added translations to many popular European and East Asian languages. Scribe uses Unicode internally and can display text correctly even if the glyphs are not available in the current font.
