= Mailpile =

Open-source email client

- Original authors: Bjarni Rúnar Einarsson, Brennan Novak, Smári McCarthy
- Developer: The Mailpile Team
- Release: 13 September 2014; 12 years ago
- Final release: 1.0.0rc6 (September 4, 2019; 7 years ago) [±]
- Written in: Python
- Operating system: Linux, macOS, Windows
- Platform: Web platform
- Available in: More than 14 languages Arabic (ar) Danish (da_DK) German (de) Greek (el_GR) Spanish (es_ES) French (fr_FR) Croatian (hr) Icelandic (is) Japanese (ja) Lithuanian (lt) Norwegian Bokmål (nb_NO) Dutch (nl_BE) Dutch (nl_NL) Polish (pl) Portuguese (pt_BR) Russian (ru_RU) Albanian (sq) Swedish (sv) Ukrainian (uk) Chinese (zh_CN)
- Type: Webmail
- License: 2015: AGPL-3.0-or-later; 2013: Dual-licensed (Note: AGPL-3.0-or-later or Apache-2.0+); 2011: AGPL-3.0-or-later
- Website: Official website
- Repository: github.com/mailpile/Mailpile

Mailpile was a free and open-source email client with the main focus of privacy and usability. It is a webmail client, albeit one run from the user's computer, as a downloaded program launched as a local website.

== Features ==
In the default setup of the program, the user is given a public and a private PGP key, for the purpose of (respectively) receiving encrypted email and then decrypting it. Mailpile uses PGP and stores all locally generated files in encrypted form on-disk. The client takes an opportunistic approach to finding other users to encrypt to, those that support it, and integrates this in the process of sending email.

The program preloads a lot of email data into RAM to accelerate search results. While the search results remain really fast despite large amounts of emails, this gradually slows down the start-up time of the program as stored email data increases. This feature will likely be altered in the planned Mailpile version 2.

== History ==
Mailpile started out as a search engine in 2011.

In 2025, the developer has stated that work on the software has halted for years and users shouldn't rely on it for future projects.

== Crowdfunding ==
The project gained recognition following an Indiegogo crowdfunding campaign, raising $163,192 between August and September 2013. In the middle of the campaign, PayPal froze a large portion of the raised funds, and subsequently released them after Mailpile took the issue to the public on blogs and social media platforms including Twitter.

=== Releases ===
==== Alpha ====
The first publicly tagged release 0.1.0 from January 2014 included an original typeface (also by the name of "Mailpile"), UI feedback of encryption and signatures, custom search engine, integrated spam-filtering support, and localization to around 30 languages.

==== Alpha II ====
July 2014 This release introduced storing logs encrypted, partial native IMAP support, and the spam filtering engine gained more ways to auto-classify e-mail. The graphical interface was revamped. A wizard was introduced to help users with account setup.

==== Beta ====
Mailpile released a beta version in September 2014.

==== Beta II ====
January 2015 1024 bit keys were no longer being generated, in favour of stronger, 4096 bit PGP keys.

==== Beta III ====
July 2015

==== Release Candidate ====
A preliminary version of the 1.0 version was released on 13 August at the Dutch SHA2017 Hacker Camp, where the main developer gave a talk about the project.

=== Moggie ===
On 2023, NGI0 Entrust grant was secured for Mailpile 2 codenamed Moggie. As of 2025, the development continued on a separate repository.
