= Canary Mail =

Cross-platform email client

- Release: 2016
- Operating system: Windows, Android, macOS, iOS, watchOS
- Type: Email client
- Website: canarymail.io

Canary Mail is a cross-platform email client developed by Mailr Tech LLP. It was initially released for macOS and iOS in 2016, and subsequently expanded to other platforms. It provides tools for email management, security and productivity, incorporating language models.

== History ==
Canary Mail was developed by brothers Sohel Sanghani and Dev Sanghani. Canary Mail initially positioned itself as a secure and privacy-centric email client, drawing positive reviews on its security features from TechRadar and The Next Web.

Sequoia Capital provided Canary Mail with $2 million USD in venture capital in 2022. Canary Mail pivoted to focussing on AI-features in 2023, making a deal with OpenAI.
