= Indexed search =

Indexed search, also called the cutpoint method, is an algorithm for discrete-distribution pseudo-random number sampling, invented by Chen and Asau in 1974.

== Sources ==
- Chen, H. C.; Asau, Y. (1974). "On Generating Random Variates from an Empirical Distribution". AIIE Transactions. 6 (2): 163–166. doi:10.1080/05695557408974949.
- Fishman, G.S. (1996) Monte Carlo. Concepts, Algorithms, and Applications. New York: Springer.
- Ripley, B. D. (1987) Stochastic Simulation. Wiley. ISBN 0-471-81884-4
