= XTuple =

Enterprise software company

xTuple
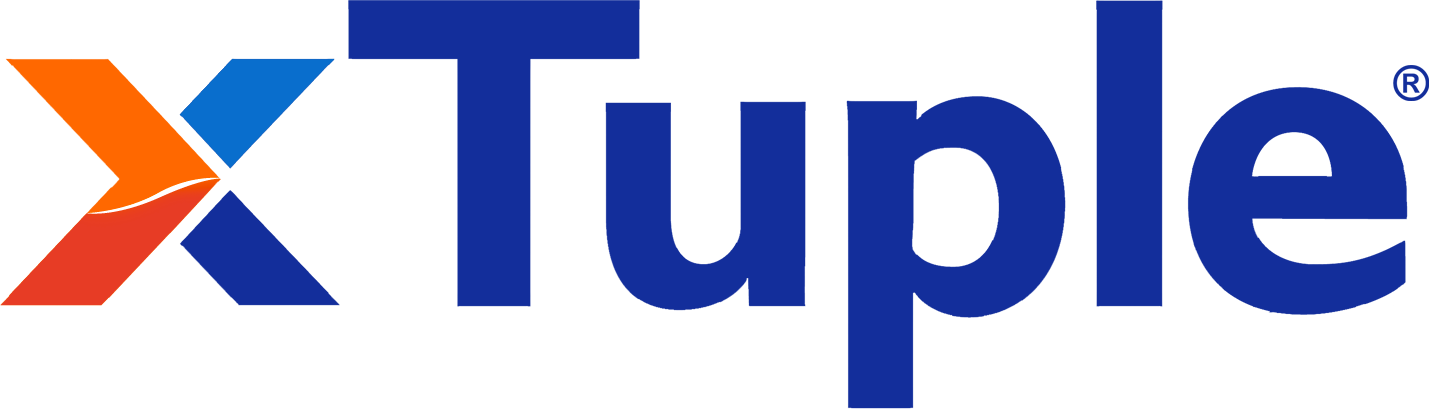
- Type: Private
- Industry: Software
- Founded: 2001
- Founder: Jeffrey Lyon; Ned Lilly
- Headquarters: Lincoln, Rhode Island, United States
- Key people: Brian Rigney (CEO)
- Products: ERP

xTuple is a privately held American enterprise software company that develops and markets software under the brand name xTuple ERP. The company was originally formed in 2001 as OpenMFG and rebranded as xTuple in 2007.

== History ==
xTuple, originally OpenMFG, was founded by Jeffrey Lyon and Ned Lilly in October 2001. The company rebranded from OpenMFG to xTuple in July 2007.

xTuple former headquarters in Norfolk, Virginia

OpenMFG was a commercially licensed ERP system targeted toward small to midsize manufacturers. The company adopted a "community code" model, meaning customers who purchase or subscribe to licenses for the product have access to view and modify the source code. The code was not made publicly available.

OpenMFG spent several years building its product, and settled into a release cycle of roughly one major release every twelve months. Version 2.0 of OpenMFG released in 2006, adding Master Production Schedule, multi-currency, and CRM functionalities.

Jeffrey Lyon departed OpenMFG in 2004.

Originally to be released under the "xTuple License," a derivative of the Mozilla Public License, xTuple was quickly criticized for introducing "yet another" open source license variant. However, at that very same conference SocialText announced the release of the new Open Source Initiative approved Common Public Attribution License (CPAL). Two days later xTuple switched PostBooks to CPAL and became the second company to adopt this license.

In July 2022, xTuple was purchased by CAI Software, LLC, a software company based in Lincoln, Rhode Island. CAI Software is majority-owned by Symphony Technology Group (STG), a private equity firm based in Palo Alto, California.

== Technology ==
xTuple ERP provides multiple interface options including a locally installable GUI client application, a web client, and a web services API for third-party application integration.

=== GUI client ===
The GUI client is written in Qt, a C++ toolkit for application development. It lets application developers target all major operating systems (Windows, Linux/Unix, Mac) with a single application source code. Qt provides a platform-independent API to all central platform functionality: GUI, database access, networking, file handling, etc. The Qt library encapsulates the different APIs of different operating systems, providing the application programmer with a single, common API for all operating systems. The native C APIs are encapsulated in a set of object-oriented C++ classes.

=== Web client ===
The browser-based web client introduced in version was deprecated in v4.10.0 and removed in v5.0.0. The web client was built entirely in JavaScript using the Enyo framework for presentation and Backbone.js for model handling.

=== Web services ===
The web client application is served by a NodeJS server, which also provides a REST based web services API that can be used for third party integration.

=== Database ===
xTuple uses the PostgreSQL database exclusively for storing and managing data. The GUI client relies heavily on PostgreSQL's native procedural language (PL/pgSQL) functions to process business logic, while the web client and node layers leverage additional capability made possible by the integration of Google's V8 JavaScript engine into the database using an extension.
