= Application Configuration Access Protocol =

T-shirt of Second International ACAP Conference

The Application Configuration Access Protocol (ACAP) is a protocol for storing and synchronizing general configuration and preference data. It was originally developed so that IMAP clients can easily access address books, user options, and other data on a central server and be kept in synch across all clients.

Two International ACAP Conferences were held, one in Pittsburgh, PA, USA, in 1997, and the other at Qualcomm Incorporated, San Diego, CA, USA, in February 1998.

ACAP grew to encompass several other areas, including bookmark management for web browsers—it's effectively a roaming protocol for Internet applications. ACAP is in use by at least four clients and three servers to varying degrees, but it has never achieved the popularity of Lightweight Directory Access Protocol or SyncML. It is a deceptively simple protocol, but the combination of three key features, hierarchical data, fine-grained access control, and "contexts" or saved searches with notification, has caused serious problems for server implementors.

Unlike LDAP, ACAP was designed for frequent writes, disconnected mode access (meaning clients can go offline and then resynchronize later), and so on. It also handles data inheritance, sometimes known as stacking, which provides easy creation of defaults.

The IETF ACAP Working Group ceased activity in April 2004, having released two RFCs, RFC 2244 ("ACAP — Application Configuration Access Protocol") and RFC 2245 ("Anonymous SASL Mechanism").

== See also ==
- Kolab
- iCalendar
- WebDAV
- CalDAV
- IMSP
