= Hiri (email client) =

MD Joynul islam

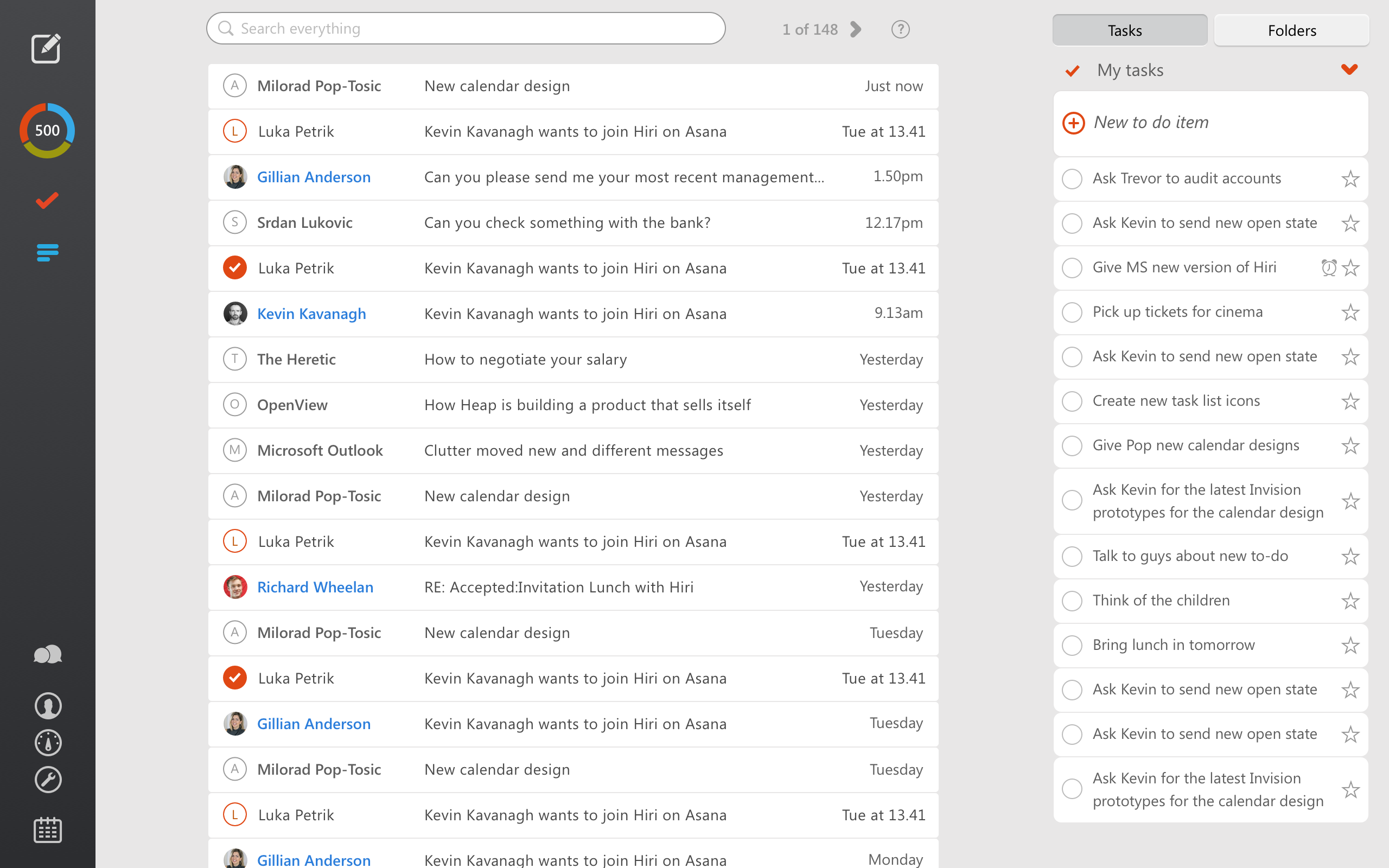
- Developer: Hiri Inc
- Initial release: October 1, 2012; 13 years ago
- Final release: 1.4.0.5 / August 20, 2018; 7 years ago
- Written in: Python and Qt, QML
- Operating system: Windows, macOS, Linux
- Platform: Qt
- Type: Email client
- License: Retail
- Website: https://www.hiri.com

Hiri was (now defunct) a business focused desktop e-mail client for sending and receiving e-mails, managing calendars, contacts, and tasks. It was developed as an alternative to existing e-mail clients and calendar applications such as Microsoft Outlook and Mozilla Thunderbird.

Although Hiri was developed actively with many releases in primarily 2017 and the first half of 2018, there have been no new releases and no active development anymore since August 2018. Also, Hiri Suggestions, a dedicated subdomain for acquiring new ideas for development, has not received replies from the development since last year.

Hiri uses the cross-platform Qt framework to run on Windows, macOS and Linux. Hiri does not support IMAP and only uses Microsoft Exchange Server infrastructure.

Hiri has been funded by Telefonica, Delta Partners, ACT Venture Capital, Enterprise Ireland and Angel investors Facebook and LinkedIn.

In March 2017, Hiri began charging a subscription service ($39 yearly; $119 lifetime).

== Features ==
- E-mail synchronization using Microsoft Exchange Web Services (EWS) API
- Compatible with Exchange 2010 SP2+ and Office 365
- Full-featured calendar
- Local SQLite database for fast searching of emails
- Exchange Global Address List (GAL)
- Integrated task manager
- Folder management
- Conversation view
- Automatic categorization of emails into Actionable and FYI inboxes
- OAuth 2.0 authentication
- Corporate SSO providers (such as Okta)
- Anonymously rate the quality of emails that you receive

== Supported email providers ==
Hiri supports in-house corporate Microsoft Exchange servers as well as Office 365, Outlook.com, Live.com, and Hotmail.com.
