= Maildir =

E-mail format

- Filename extension: None; a directory structure
- Internet media type: None registered
- Developed by: Daniel J. Bernstein
- Initial release: 1995; 31 years ago
- Type of format: Email mailbox storage
- Container for: Email messages in RFC 5322 form
- Extended to: Maildir++
- Standard: De facto, per Bernstein's Using maildir format
- Website: cr.yp.to/proto/maildir.html

The Maildir e-mail format is a common way of storing email messages on a file system, rather than in a database. Each message is assigned a file with a unique name, and each mail folder is a file system directory containing these files. Maildir was designed by Daniel J. Bernstein circa 1995, with a major goal of eliminating the need for program code to handle file locking and unlocking through use of the local filesystem. Maildir design reflects the fact that the only operations valid for an email message are that it be created, deleted, or have its status changed in some way.

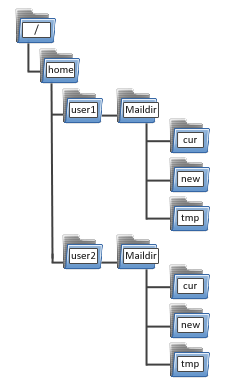
Internal structure

== Specifications ==
A Maildir directory (often named Maildir) usually has three subdirectories named tmp, new, and cur.

- The tmp subdirectory temporarily stores e-mail messages that are in the process of being delivered. This subdirectory may also store other kinds of temporary files.
- The new subdirectory stores messages that have been delivered, but have not yet been seen by any mail application.
- The cur subdirectory stores messages that have already been seen by mail applications.

=== Maildir++ ===
Sam Varshavchik, the author of the Courier Mail Server and other software, defined the Maildir++ extension to the Maildir format to support subfolders and mail quotas. Maildir++ directories contain subdirectories with names that start with a '.' (dot) which are also Maildir++ folders. The extension complies with the original Maildir specification, which allows for subdirectories in addition to tmp, new and cur.

== Technical operation ==
A mail delivery agent is a program that delivers an email message into a Maildir. The mail delivery agent creates a new file with a unique filename in the tmp directory. At the time of its invention guaranteeing unique filenames efficiently was difficult. The original qmail algorithm for unique names was:

1. read the current Unix time
2. read the current process identifier (PID)
3. read the current hostname
4. concatenate the above three values into a string separated by the period character; this is the new filename
5. if stat() reports that the filename exists, then wait two seconds
6. go to previous step until the filename does not exist
7. create a file with the unique filename and write the message contents to the new file

By 2000, the qmail author recommended in an updated specification to append the value of a per-process counter to the PID, whose value should be incremented after each delivery. The rate-limiting recommendation to "wait two seconds" was dropped.

By 2003, the recommendations had been further amended to require that instead of the PID and counter, the middle part of the filename should be created by "concatenating enough of the following strings to guarantee uniqueness" even in the face of multiple simultaneous deliveries to the same maildir from one or more processes:

- #n, where n is (in hexadecimal) the output of the operating system's unix_sequencenumber() system call, which returns a number that increases by 1 every time it is called, starting from 0 after reboot.
- Xn, where n is (in hexadecimal) the output of the operating system's unix_bootnumber() system call, which reports the number of times that the system has been booted. Together with #, this guarantees uniqueness; unfortunately, most operating systems don't support unix_sequencenumber() and unix_bootnumber().
- Rn, where n is (in hexadecimal) the output of the operating system's unix_cryptorandomnumber() system call or an equivalent source, such as /dev/urandom. Unfortunately, some operating systems don't include cryptographic random number generators.
- In, where n is (in hexadecimal) the UNIX inode number of this file. Unfortunately, inode numbers aren't always available through NFS.
- Vn, where n is (in hexadecimal) the UNIX device number of this file. Unfortunately, device numbers aren't always available through NFS. (Device numbers are also not helpful with the standard UNIX filesystem: a maildir has to be within a single UNIX device for link() and rename() to work.)
- Mn, where n is (in decimal) the microsecond counter from the same gettimeofday() used for the left part of the unique name.
- Pn, where n is (in decimal) the process ID.
- Qn, where n is (in decimal) the number of deliveries made by this process.

This 2003 algorithm was criticised in 2006 as being unnecessarily complex by Timo Sirainen, the creator of Dovecot.

As of November 2023, qmail author Daniel Bernstein had made no further changes to the 2003 filename generation recommendations. On modern POSIX systems, temporary files can be safely created with the mkstemp C library function.

The delivery process stores the message in the maildir by creating and writing to tmp/uniquefilename, and then moving this file to new/uniquefilename. The moving can be done using rename, which is atomic in many systems. Alternatively, it can be done by hard-linking the file to new and then unlinking the file from tmp. Any leftover file will eventually be deleted. This sequence guarantees that a maildir-reading program will not see a partially written message. There can be multiple programs reading a maildir at the same time. They range from mail user agents (MUAs), which access the server's file system directly, through Internet Message Access Protocol or Post Office Protocol servers acting on behalf of remote MUAs, to utilities such as biff and rsync, which may or may not be aware of the maildir structure. Readers should never look in tmp.

When a cognizant maildir-reading process (either a POP or IMAP server, or a mail user agent acting locally) finds messages in the new directory, it must move them to cur. It is just a means to notify the user "you have X new messages". This moving needs to be done using the atomic filesystem rename(), as the alternative link-then-unlink technique is non-atomic and may result in duplicated messages. An informational suffix is appended to filenames at this stage. It consists of a colon (to separate the unique part of the filename from the actual information), a "2", a comma and various flags. The "2" specifies the version of the information that follows the comma. "2" is the only currently officially specified version, "1" being an experimental version. The specification defines flags that show whether the message has been read, deleted and so on: the initial (capital) letter of "Passed", "Replied", "Seen", "Trashed", "Draft", and "Flagged". Applications often choose to supplement this very limited set of flags, for example notmuch offers flag synchronization in addition to arbitrary user-defined flags, while Dovecot uses lowercase letters to match 26 IMAP keywords, which may include keywords such as $MDNSent or user-defined flags.

Although Maildir was intended to allow lockless usage, in practice some software that uses Maildirs also uses locks, such as Dovecot.

== File-system compatibility issues ==
The Maildir standard can only be implemented on systems that accept colons in filenames.

Systems that do not allow colons in filenames (this includes Microsoft Windows and some configurations of Novell Storage Services) can use a non-standard alternative separator, such as ";" or "-". It is often trivial to patch free and open-source software to use a different separator.

As there is currently no agreement on what character this alternative separator should be, there can be interoperability difficulties between different Maildir-supporting programs on these systems. However, not all Maildir-related software needs to know what the separator character is, because not all Maildir-related software needs to be able to read or modify the flags of a message ("read", "replied to" etc.); software that merely delivers to a Maildir or archives old messages from it based only on date, should work no matter what separator is in use. If only the MUA needs to read or modify message flags, and only one MUA is used, then non-standard alternative separators may be used without interoperability problems.

== Software that supports Maildir directly ==
=== Mail servers ===
- Dovecot IMAP server
- Courier Mail Server SMTP and IMAP server, for which the Maildir++ format was invented
- Sendmail The original SMTP server (with an external Local delivery agent such as Maildrop or dovecot-lda)
- Exim SMTP server
- Postfix SMTP server
- qmail SMTP server, for which the Maildir format was invented
- MeTA1 SMTP server
- OpenSMTPD SMTP server
- Stalwart Mail Server, SMTP and IMAP server implemented in Rust

=== Delivery agents ===
- procmail
- Dovecot delivery agent
- maildrop
- getmail, a Maildir-aware mail-retrieval and delivery agent alternative to Fetchmail
- fdm
- muchsync, synchronising notmuch mail mailboxes between any number of replicas
- OfflineIMAP
- isync, synchronises mailboxes, supporting Maildir and IMAP4
- Attomail, a minimal Maildir-aware MDA implemented in Haskell
- lieer – Gmail synchronization tool for Maildir

=== Mail readers ===
- aerc (efficient and extensible email client)
- Balsa previously the official GNOME mail reader (prior to Evolution)
- Cone a curses-based mail reader
- Evolution, official GNOME mail client
- GNUMail
- Gnus
- Himalaya – Command-line email interface, from the Pimalaya Rust project
- KMail, KDE mail reader
- mailx
- Mutt
- Notmuch (fast, global-search and tag-based email system)
- Pine/Alpine
- meli – Terminal email client written in Rust
- Mozilla Thunderbird – experimental and “disabled by default because there are still many bugs”

== See also ==
- mbox
- MH Message Handling System
- MIX (email)
