= Fastmail =

Australian email service provider

- Fastmail logo since June 2019

- The inbox in Fastmail's web client
- Website type: Webmail, POP3, IMAP4
- Available in: 36 languages
- Headquarters: Melbourne, Victoria, Australia
- Owner: Fastmail Pty Ltd
- Key people: Rob Mueller (founder, CTO)
- Website: fastmail.com
- Commercial: Yes
- Registration: Required
- Launched: 1999; 27 years ago
- Current status: Online

Fastmail is a subscription-based email hosting company based in Melbourne, Australia. In addition to its Fastmail-branded services, the company also operates Topicbox, a mailing list service, and Pobox, an email service it acquired in 2015.

The company was acquired by Opera Software in 2010 but became independent again in 2013 through a staff buyout. Its servers are located in Philadelphia, Pennsylvania, St. Louis, Missouri, and Amsterdam, the Netherlands.

== History ==
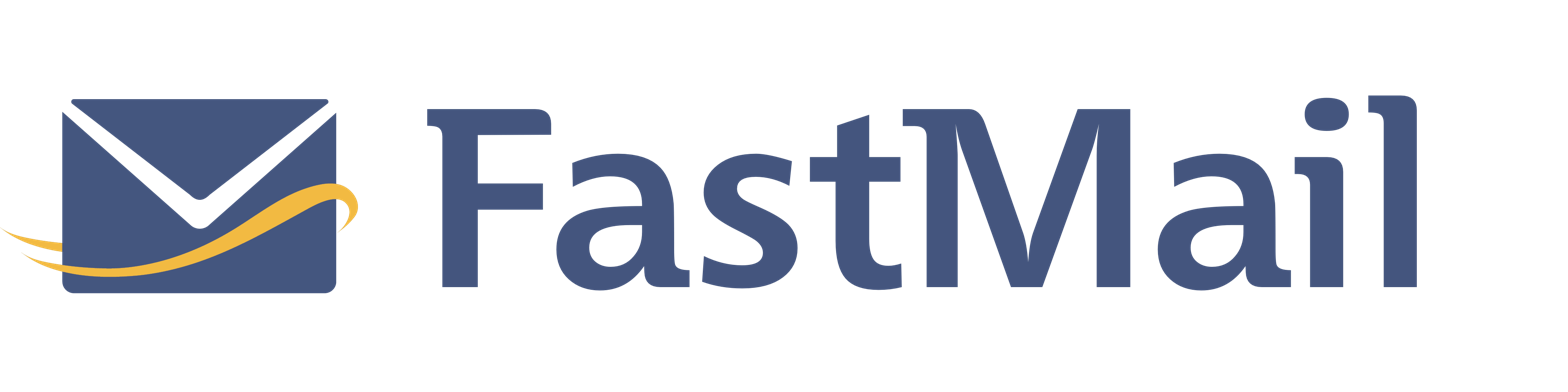
FastMail old logo before June 2019

Fastmail was founded in 1999 by Rob Mueller, Bruce Davey, and Jeremy Howard, to provide email service for customers of the Optimal Decisions Group.

The provider's sole product line is email services (and included accessories), but it was owned by Opera Software (best known for its web browser) from 2010 to 2013. Through a staff buyout, the company became fully independent again.

When first established, the service was intended to differentiate itself through providing features that were not yet available from other market players. Early on, this included the ease and speed of email transport and access, personalities and IMAP and SSL support, and an independent public forum and wiki among user support options. Over the years, these features became commonplace, but features such as WebDAV, secure LDAP, opportunistic inter-server encryption, reliability via minimization of single points of failure, and customizable filtering via Sieve are current differentiators.

In 2003, mail servers were moved under the domain name messagingengine.com. On 23 October 2014, Fastmail moved their primary domain from fastmail.fm to fastmail.com.

On 18 October 2012 Fastmail announced that new signups for the free service level had been discontinued. Existing free Fastmail accounts would not be discontinued, but if a free account was deactivated because it was not logged into in over 120 days, it would not be reactivated. The company stated that they had decided to focus Fastmail as a "premium brand" with only paid accounts. All existing "guest" and "one-time payment" email accounts were discontinued on 31 July 2017 as Fastmail transitioned into a subscription-only email service. Existing users were given the option to subscribe to Fastmail with a discount or to request a refund of their one-time payment.

As of December 2018, Fastmail and all other Australian companies are subject to the Assistance and Access Bill, which compels them to assist law enforcement in accessing encrypted communications if warranted during an investigation. Fastmail stated that while their services were not "materially affected" since they already complied with warrants per the Telecommunications Act, concerns have been shown by customers over the bill's effects.

On 24 June 2019, Fastmail launched a refreshed UI design, with a new logo, app icon, colors, and website. The logo now reads "Fastmail" instead of "FastMail".

== Features ==
=== Address and domain management ===
Fastmail offers users many domain choices for their email addresses. Many of these domains begin with "fastmail" followed by various top-level domains (e.g., fastmail.com, fastmail.co.uk, fastmail.jp). In addition to these Fastmail-branded options, the service also provides numerous other domains, including 123mail.org, airpost.net, mailbolt.com, and sent.as. Users also have the option to use their own custom domains.

To manage email identities, users can create up to 600 aliases, which are additional email addresses that deliver to the same inbox. This allows for separate addresses for different purposes (e.g., work, personal, or specific services) without creating new user accounts. For users with custom domains, catch-all aliases can be configured to receive any email sent to that domain, regardless of the address specified.

Fastmail offers a feature called 'Masked Email'. This allows users to generate unique, random email addresses for every online service they sign up for, keeping their primary email address private. If a masked address begins to receive spam, it can be disabled or deleted, and it helps identify which service may have shared or leaked the user's data. Fastmail provides integrations with the password managers 1Password and Bitwarden, allowing users to create Masked Email addresses directly from the password manager's interface when signing up for new accounts.

=== Applications ===
Fastmail can be accessed through its web interface, dedicated mobile apps for iOS and Android, dedicated desktop apps for Mac, Windows, and Linux, or as a Progressive Web App (PWA) on supported desktop browsers. On December 16, 2024, the team announced a public beta testing of offline support for the mobile apps, allowing to, for example, compose an email without requiring an active internet connection.

=== Organization ===
The service provides tools for organizing mail. Users can choose between labels or traditional folders. Powerful mail rules (filters) can be created to automatically organize incoming mail, with support for advanced customization through the Sieve scripting language. A vacation response (autoreply) can be set for any email address, and a restore tool allows for the recovery of messages, contacts, events, or notes deleted within the past seven days.

=== Additional features ===
Beyond email, users can create and manage calendars and notes within the web interface, which can be synchronized with other devices and applications using the CalDAV and IMAP protocols, respectively. A comprehensive address book allows users to manage contacts. The contacts feature is integrated with the mail interface, enabling users to view contact details and conversation history in a sidebar, add senders to contacts directly from a message, and receive auto-complete suggestions when composing an email. Contacts can be marked as VIPs, which adds a star icon to their messages and allows for specific notifications for that group. Adding a sender to the address book also serves to whitelist them, preventing their messages from being marked as spam. Contacts can be synced through the CardDAV protocol.

== Technology ==
The site developers are among active contributors to the widely used Cyrus IMAP open source software project and include the lead developer and maintainer of Perl module Mail::IMAPTalk. Fastmail supported the development of a now abandoned rewriting Roundcube Next on the free software webmail interface Roundcube, and developed JMAP – a new open email protocol.

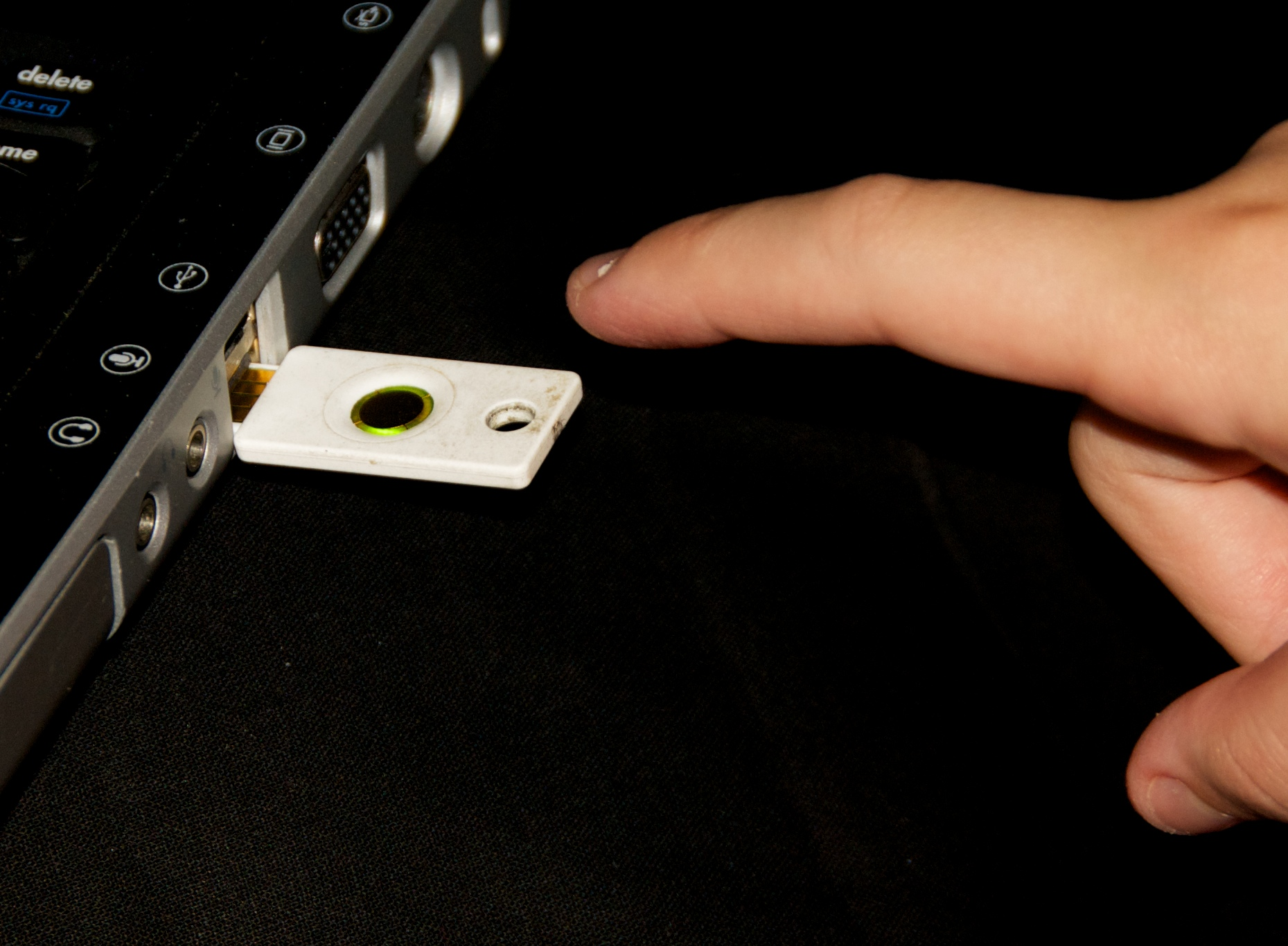
YubiKey inserted into a USB port

Fastmail also provides for two-factor login using a YubiKey. While associating one or more YubiKeys with a Fastmail account will not prevent normal logins, it allowed for logging on to an email account with just a YubiKey and its auto-generated one-time passwords, making it suitable for accessing email on public machines. The YubiKey-only login feature was discontinued in July 2016, as it was rarely used, according to the Fastmail team.

The email service also supports the U2F and the TOTP protocol as a secondary sign-in factor, allowing users to sign in with their password and a security token as an extra security feature. In August 2024 Fastmail introduced support for passwordless authentication with passkeys.

== See also ==
- Comparison of webmail providers
