= Getmail =

Mail retrieval agent

getmail
- Original author: Charles Cazabon
- Initial release: 1998; 28 years ago
- Stable release: 5.16 / October 31, 2021; 4 years ago
- Written in: Python
- Operating system: Unix-like, Posix
- Type: E-mail
- License: GNU General Public License v2
- Website: pyropus.ca/software/getmail/

getmail is a simple mail retrieval agent intended as a replacement for fetchmail, implemented in Python. It can retrieve mail from POP3, IMAP4, and Standard Dial-up POP3 Service servers, with or without SSL. It supports simple and domain (multidrop) mailboxes, mail filtering via any arbitrary program, and supports a wide variety of mail destination types, including mboxrd, maildir, and external arbitrary mail delivery agents. It also has a simpler configuration syntax than fetchmail, but supports fewer authentication protocols. The software can also function as a basic mail delivery agent.

Getmail is free software and is licensed under the GNU General Public License version 2. It is written and maintained by Charles Cazabon.

The original getmail software requires Python 2, which is no longer supported. A fork named getmail6, which is not from getmail's original author, provides Python 3 support.

== See also ==
- Mail retrieval agent
- fetchmail
- fdm
- OfflineIMAP
