= Email agent (infrastructure) =

Schema of email delivery

An email agent is a program that is part of the email infrastructure, from composition by sender, to transfer across the network, to viewing by recipient. The best-known are message user agents (MUAs, aka, email clients) and message transfer agents (MTAs, programs that transfer email between clients), but finer divisions exist.

More precisely, this is a technical way of referring to functions performed by various programs, considering them as software agents: a given program may perform several functions, but while it is performing a given function (such as message transfer), it is referred to as a message transfer agent. These terms are most often used within internet standards, and technical discussions of email infrastructure, not by end users.

While the individual terms are widely used in internet standards and RFCs, there is no widely used umbrella term for these programs, though such a program may informally be referred to generically as an MxA, where "x" is a wildcard, as the programs are referred to by acronyms of this form, such as MUA and MTA, with "x" depending on role.

Email servers are built from one or more software packages, each of which carries out the functions of one or more MxA.

== Classification ==
The finest and most expansive classification in current use is into five functions in addition to the mail exchanger (MX):

- Message user agent (MUA)
- Message submission agent (MSA)
- Message transfer agent (MTA)
- Message delivery agent (MDA)
- Mail retrieval agent (MRA) (Unlike the above terms, this term is not supported by IETF documents, in which it is considered an MUA.)

The traditional division is into client-side (MUA) and server-side (MTA, notably sendmail), with the flow given as:

MUA → MTA → … → MTA → MUA,

Other divisions have been made to draw distinctions that some have found useful, which are detailed as follows.

A detailed flow of a message through these various agents is given at , and may be summarized as

MUA → MSA → MTA → … → MTA → MDA →→ MRA →→ MUA,

with the arrow styles changing to distinguish between push steps (→) and pull steps (→→).

Another source gives the flow as:

MUA → (MSA) → MTA → … → MX → MDA →→ MRA/MUA,

Programs such as fetchmail which retrieve mail from a server but do not provide a human interface for viewing or other client tasks are referred to as MRAs – they provide retrieval but no other client functions. Traditionally and in internet standards (such as the recent RFC 5598) these are referred to as a type of MUA, because they are client-side and hence outside the scope of internet standards, and indeed many MUAs perform MRA functions. However, traditional Unix mail readers such as elm, Pine, or mutt would often not include MRA functions (or only optionally), reading mail that had already been delivered to a mailbox file (formally, delivered by an MDA).

Broadly and traditionally, any program that transfers mail between the ends (all server-side functions) is an MTA. More finely and more recently, the endpoints of the chain have been distinguished, with the initial client-server step referred to as submission, and the final server-client step referred to as delivery. The motivation for distinguishing the MSA role has largely been security, with MUA–MSA interactions (initial submission) receiving greater scrutiny than MTA–MTA (server–server) transfers. The delivery (MDA) stage is where such tasks as filtering (of undesired messages) and filing (into separate folders) occur, and are the start of the user agent; traditionally this was done via procmail, while today it may be done via server-side programs, often using spam filters such as SpamAssassin. The MDA can be said to work "before the message hits the user's mailbox".

== See also ==
- Simple Mail Transfer Protocol

== Bibliography ==
- Bauer, Mick (2003). "Paranoid penguin: secure mail with LDAP and IMAP, Part I". Linux Journal. 2003 (115, November 2003): 12 – via ACM.
- Crocker, Dave (July 2009). "RFC 5598: Internet Mail Architecture". IETF.
- Faircloth, Jeremy (11 Dec 2013). Enterprise Applications Administration: The Definitive Guide to Implementation and Operations. Morgan Kaufmann. ISBN 9780124077737.
- McBee, Jim (26 Jan 2009). Mastering Microsoft Exchange Server 2007 SP1. John Wiley & Sons. ISBN 9780470478141.
- Schroder, Carla (29 Nov 2004). Linux Cookbook: Practical Advice for Linux System Administrators. O'Reilly Media. ISBN 9780596517502.
- Vakali, Athena (30 Sep 2006). Web Data Management Practices: Emerging Techniques and Technologies. Idea Group Inc (IGI). ISBN 9781599042305.
