= Cyrus IMAP server =

Email server software

- Developers: Carnegie Mellon University, Fastmail
- Stable release: 3.12.4 / 9 September 2026; 2 months ago
- Written in: C
- Type: Mail delivery agent
- License: BSD
- Website: www.cyrusimap.org
- Repository: github.com/cyrusimap/cyrus-imapd

The Cyrus IMAP server is electronic mail server software developed by Carnegie Mellon University. It differs from other Internet Message Access Protocol (IMAP) server implementations in that it is generally intended to be run on sealed servers, where normal users cannot log in.

== Overview ==
The mail spool uses a filesystem layout and format similar to the Maildir format used by other popular email servers such as qmail, Courier, Dovecot, etc. Users can access mail through the JMAP, IMAP/IMAP-S, POP3/POP3-S or KPOP protocols.

The Cyrus IMAP server supports server-side mail filtering through the implementation of a mail filtering language called Sieve.

The private mailbox database design gives the server considerable advantages in efficiency, scalability, and administratability. Multiple concurrent read/write connections to the same mailbox are permitted. The server supports access control lists on mailboxes and storage quotas on mailbox hierarchies.

As of version 2.4.17, there is support for CalDAV and CardDAV to provide an integrated calendaring and email solution, and also support for viewing email via an RSS reader.

In terms of user management, it has a simple implementation of SASL which is specified in the Internet Standard RFC 2222.

== History ==
Prior to 1994, Carnegie Mellon University's email was based on the locally developed and non-standard Andrew Messaging System (AMS) - written in the early 1980s as part of the Andrew Project. This was very advanced for its day, but had major scalability issues and Carnegie Mellon wanted to move to a standards-compliant mail system that met or exceeded the feature set of AMS.

In 1994 the Computing Services Division at Carnegie Mellon addressed these goals by starting the Cyrus Project. In 1998, Carnegie Mellon placed all of its incoming freshmen (the class of 2002) on the Cyrus server for the first time and in December 2001, board access (which had been mirrored from AMS to Cyrus), was cut over to Cyrus completely. AMS was finally phased out in May 2002.

The Computing Services Division later developed Cyrus "Murder" clustering, (Note: The term "murder" is borrowed from the commonly-used collective noun for crows.) and after several revisions deployed it within Carnegie Mellon in the summer of 2002.

Several members of the Cyrus development team at Carnegie Mellon went on to become leaders in the development of large-scale electronic mail infrastructure elsewhere: John Gardiner Myers was Chief Architect of Host Mail Infrastructure at America Online; and Rob Siemborski worked on Gmail infrastructure at Google.

In late 2016, Carnegie Mellon announced the retirement of Cyrus IMAP as their electronic mail storage service, with Cyrus users required to choose between on-campus Microsoft Exchange and Google "G Suite" off-campus mail.

As of 2018, Cyrus was being actively developed, with Carnegie Mellon University remaining active in development, and providing the infrastructure. Staff at Fastmail contributed significantly to Cyrus as of 2018, as they depend upon it as part of their commercial service.

== See also ==
- Comparison of mail servers
- UW IMAP
