= OfflineIMAP =

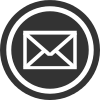

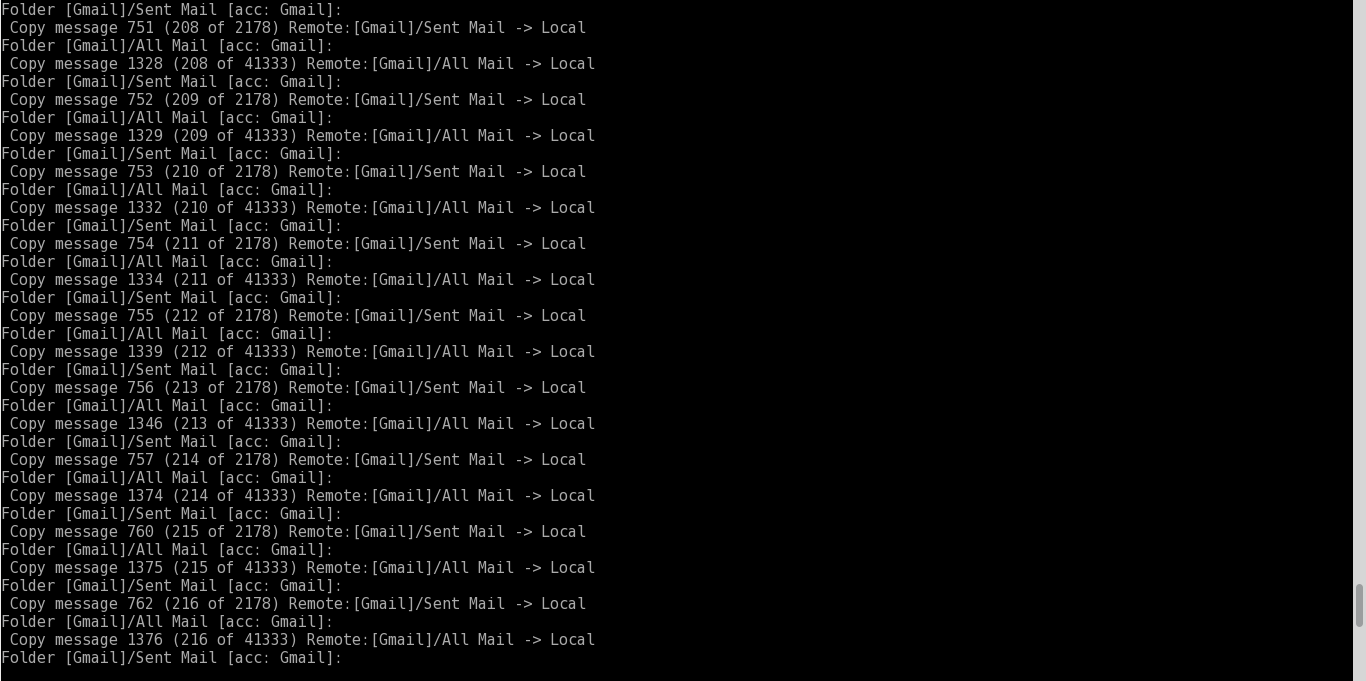
- OfflineIMAP with TTYUI interface
- Original author: John Goerzen
- Developer: Nicolas Sebrecht et al.
- Initial release: 2002; 23 years ago
- Stable release: 7.3.4 (August 3, 2021; 4 years ago) [±]
- Repository: github.com/OfflineIMAP/offlineimap3
- Written in: Python
- Operating system: Unix-like, Windows
- Available in: English
- Type: Email synchronization
- License: GNU GPLv2+
- Website: www.offlineimap.org

OfflineIMAP is IMAP synchronization utility software, capable of synchronizing mail on IMAP server with local Maildir folder or another server.

== Description ==
The synchronization is performed bidirectionally between two endpoints ("Remote" and "Local" repositories).

OfflineIMAP accesses mail servers only via Internet Message Access Protocol. (It does not support Post Office Protocol, another popular way to get mail from a server.) It works faster (though it is sensitive to connection's latency) and supports more advanced features than most mail clients. A special mode for better handling the non-standard implementation of IMAP in Gmail may optionally be enabled in a configuration file.

When configured to store mail locally, OfflineIMAP uses the Maildir format. Unix mail boxes support may be added in the future, though currently it is not implemented.

== Configuration ==
Several synchronization accounts, each consisting of Remote and Local repositories, may be defined in configuration file. Each repository is then configured separately, allowing to specify credentials and access method.

=== Filtering and translation ===
OfflineIMAP is capable of filtering the folders of Remote repository, so that only partial synchronization would occur if needed. To use this capability one has to define the mask that would be matched against the list of folders with each synchronization. This is achieved by using Python's lambda capability; for example, to synchronize only "INBOX", "Sent Mail" and "Received" folders one should specify the following rule:

folderfilter = lambda foldername: foldername in ["INBOX", "Sent Mail", "Received"]

Remaining folders' names may be altered (translated) using similar construct:

nametrans = lambda foldername: re.sub(
    "^Sent$", "root/Sent", re.sub("^(\[G.*ail\]|INBOX)", "root", foldername)
)

This technique may also be used to synchronize the content of an IMAP server to the folder of another server.

=== Limitations ===
Each account has to use separate directory; otherwise the synchronization process may suffer from unexpected behavior or even data loss.

=== User interface ===
OfflineIMAP provides several command-line interfaces, including interactive color curses-based, non-interactive console logging, and several yet less verbose modes. Tk-based graphical user interface is also available.

== See also ==
- Mail delivery agent
- getmail
- fetchmail
