= Text-based email client =

Email client that does not use graphics

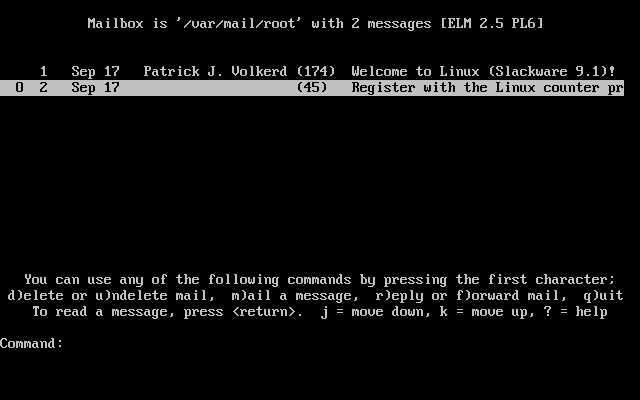
Screenshot of Elm

A text-based email client is an email client with its user interface being text-based, occupying a whole terminal screen. Other kind of email clients are GUI-based (cf. email client) or Web-based, see Webmail.

Text-based email clients may be useful for users with visual impairment or partial blindness allowing speech synthesis or text-to-speech software to read content to users. Text-based email clients also allow to manage communication via simple remote sessions, e. g. per SSH, for instance when it is not possible to install a local GUI-client and/or access mail via Web interface. Also users may prefer text-based user interfaces in general.

Typical features include:

- Editing various emails via tab support
- Configurable rendering of various MIME types, for instance OpenPGP encryption or HTML email
- Vim-style keybindings
- Support for multiple accounts and protocols, e. g. IMAP, Maildir, SMTP, and sendmail
- UTF-8 support

== List of text-based email clients ==
Notable clients include:

- aerc
- Cone
- Elm
- Emacs: Gnus, mu4e, rmail, Wanderlust, Notmuch (emacs interface)
- Lumail
- mblaze
- meli
- Mutt
  - NeoMutt
- pine
  - alpine
- sup
- vim (using a plugin for himalaya)

Email software for the command line that does not occupy the whole screen (cf. TUI) include e. g. Cleancode eMail, CURL, himalaya, mail (Unix), mailx, MH, procmail, sendmail, and many others.

== See also ==
- Text-based web browser
- Comparison of email clients
