= Email agent =

Email agent may refer to:

- An email client
- Email agent (infrastructure) various components of email infrastructure
