= DAViCal =

- Developer(s): Andrew McMillan
- Stable release: 1.1.12 / March 14, 2023; 2 years ago
- Repository: gitlab.com/davical-project/davical
- Written in: PHP & PostgreSQL
- Operating system: Server: Linux, BSD; Client: multiple
- Platform: Linux, Mac, BSD, Windows
- Type: Electronic group calendar server
- License: GNU General Public License
- Website: www.davical.org

DAViCal is a server for calendar sharing. It is an implementation of the CalDAV protocol which is designed for storing calendaring resources on a remote shared server. Although the events are stored in a SQL database the information between client and server is transferred in the iCalendar format.

== Features ==
Administration of the Calendar (CalDAV) and Address book (CardDAV) server is through a web-browser based interface. This can be accessed locally or through a network.

=== Interface ===
Several interfaces have been used with the DAViCal server. These include the Mozilla Sunbird calendar (or the Lightning calendar extension of Thunderbird), Chandler, Evolution, and Mulberry.

=== Content access ===
Events are stored on a server which can be accessed through a network, meaning that the calendar can be viewed from any location that has Internet access. In the case of a local user experiencing a hard drive failure, it also means that no data is lost. The application can import iCalendar calendars (.ics, the de facto open calendaring file format). Multiple calendars can be added and shared, allowing various levels of permissions for users. This enables collaboration and sharing of schedules between groups.

Each calendar can have individual permissions, or permissions of groups of users can be created.

=== Sharing calendars ===
DAViCal, when combined with an appropriate interface, allows multiple calendars to be created and shown in the same view. Each can be shared, either read-only or with full edit control, and either with specified people or with everyone (public calendars).

=== Device synchronization ===
Any device that is able to install one of the client interfaces and has network access can synchronize with the DAViCal server.

== Compatibility ==
DAViCal supports CalDAV and CardDAV, with some backward compatibility features to support WebDAV also. Required prerequisites include a webserver which can run PHP scripting language and a database (currently PostgreSQL 8.1 or greater).

.rpm packages for RedHat/Fedora/CentOS and derivative Linux distributions are available, as well as .deb packages for Debian/Ubuntu/Kubuntu and derivative Linux distributions. Source code is available for other Linux distributions or for compiling for Windows.

== See also ==
- Comparison of CalDAV and CardDAV implementations
- KubuntuGuide -- installing DAViCal in Kubuntu
- UbuntuGuide -- installing DAViCal in Ubuntu
