= MCC Interim Linux =

Linux distribution

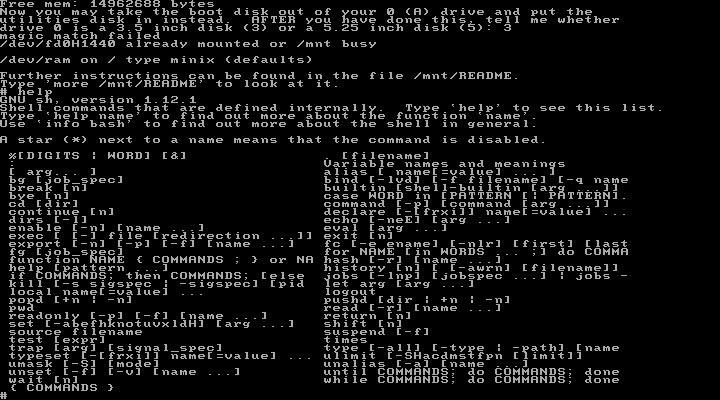
- Developer: Owen Le Blanc
- OS family: Linux (Unix-like)
- Working state: Historic
- Source model: Open source
- Initial release: February 1992
- Latest release: 2.0+ / 4 November 1996
- Available in: Various
- Update method: None (manual)
- Package manager: None
- Supported platforms: Intel 386
- Kernel type: Monolithic (Linux)
- Userland: GNU
- Default user interface: Command line interface
- License: Various

MCC Interim Linux is a Linux distribution first released in February 1992 by Owen Le Blanc of the Manchester Computing Centre (MCC), part of the University of Manchester. It was the first Linux distribution created for computer users who were not Unix experts and featured a menu-driven installer that installed both the kernel and a set of end-user and programming tools.

The MCC first made Linux available by anonymous FTP in November 1991. Le Blanc's irritation with his early experiments with Linux, such as the lack of a working fdisk (he would later write one), the need to use multiple FTP repositories to acquire all the essential software, and library version problems, inspired the creation of this distribution.

== History ==
Prior to its first release, the closest approximation to a Linux distribution had been Torvalds' "Boot-Root" floppy disk images from late 1991. These were two 5¼" diskette images containing the Linux kernel and the minimum tools required to get started. These tools were so minimal that booting from a hard drive required editing its master boot record with a hex editor.

The first release of MCC Interim Linux was based on Linux 0.12 and made use of Theodore Ts'o's ramdisk code to copy a small root image to memory, freeing the floppy drive for additional utilities diskettes.

He also stated his distributions were "unofficial experiments", describing the goals of his releases as being:

- To provide a simple installation procedure.
- To provide a more complete installation procedure.
- To provide a backup/recovery service.
- To back up his (then) current system.
- To compile, link, and test every binary file under the current versions of the kernel, gcc, and libraries.
- To provide a stable base system, which can be installed in a short time, and to which other software can be added with relatively little effort.

Indeed, no attempt was ever made to distribute it with a wide range of software or even the X386 windowing system.

== Successors ==
Soon after the first release came other distributions such as TAMU, created by individuals at Texas A&M University, Martin Junius's MJ, Softlanding Linux System and H J Lu's Linux Base System. These in turn were quickly superseded by Slackware and Debian, the oldest surviving distributions, as well as Red Hat Linux and SUSE Linux.

The 1.0 distribution of MCC Interim pointed out that Debian was "five times the size of MCC, and quite comprehensive", and the final distribution encouraged users to switch to Debian by providing transitional support.

== Included software ==
=== Version 0.95c+ ===
As discussed in an email dated 23 April 1992, the boot and utilities disk pair included:

- bash
- compress
- elvis
- gawk
- The GNU shell/file/text utilities
- grep/egrep/fgrep
- joe
- less
- make
- more
- mtools
- sed
- tar
- uuencode/uudecode

An optional pair of disks contained gcc and g++ 2.1, kermit and shoelace.

=== Version 0.99.p8 ===
Released on 14 April 1993. Added to version 0.95c+ were bison, flex, gdb, gprof, groff, gzip and man.

=== Version 0.99.p8+ ===
Released on 26 April 1993. Added to version 0.99.p8 were emacs and info.

=== Version 1.0+ ===
Added to version 0.99.p8+ were elm, lp, mail, progman, timezone and word
