= OpenAI Codex (disambiguation) =

OpenAI Codex is an AI agent and coding product developed by OpenAI.

OpenAI Codex may also refer to:

- OpenAI Codex (language model), a series of OpenAI large language models for coding tasks
