= TouchMail =

Email client for Microsoft Windows

- Developer(s): TouchMail Inc.
- Initial release: 17 April 2013; 12 years ago
- Operating system: Windows 8.1 and later
- Platform: Universal Windows Platform
- Available in: English, German
- Type: Email client
- License: Trialware
- Website: touchmail.co

TouchMail is an email client for Microsoft Windows, launched on April 17, 2013 at the DEMO Mobile Conference in San Francisco.

TouchMail was developed by a Seattle-based startup founded in 2012 by former Microsoft employees Matthew Carlson and Alex Frank as an e-mail client designed for touch input. It runs on both Windows 8.1 and Windows 10. The emails in the client can be color-coded with zoom out features to view more messages. The application integrates work and social messaging using visual and touch capabilities of computing devices.

== Features ==
TouchMail allows emails to be color-coded by sender, and its user interface is optimized for touchscreen devices, including tablets and hybrid laptops. The application also supports traditional input devices such as mouse and keyboard. Additional features include offline access to emails and a zoom-out “overview” mode that lets users browse large volumes of messages visually.

== Supported providers ==
As of 2025, TouchMail supports most major email services and many IMAP providers. These include Gmail, Outlook.com (Hotmail), Yahoo Mail, Office 365, iCloud, and AOL Mail.

== Limitations ==
TouchMail does not support POP3 accounts. Microsoft Exchange accounts are only supported if IMAP is enabled, and some smaller or less common providers may experience configuration issues.

== Reception ==
TouchMail received positive attention for its design. Time magazine described it as the type of modern app Windows 8 needed, praising its touch-optimized interface and colorful tile system. Technology sites such as Softonic noted that the app made email more visually engaging. Still, some reviews also pointed out stability issues and limited support for business users who relied on full Microsoft Exchange functionality.
