= POP3 Connector =

Software for fetching e-mails from POP3 servers

The POP3 Connector is a piece of software included with Small Business Server (SBS) versions of Microsoft Exchange Server that enables the server to fetch e-mail from external, 3rd party, POP3 servers.

== Description ==
The software can fetch e-mail on a per-user, per-account basis, or it can fetch e-mail from a catch-all account and distribute by the To: field based on the e-mail addresses assigned to users in Active Directory. Note that the latter method does not work for bcc'd e-mails and some mailing lists, as the recipient cannot be easily identified by looking at the e-mail headers. However, failed e-mail can be delivered to a central account, where the correct recipient can be identified manually and then distributed accordingly by the administrator.

The software is then scheduled to fetch e-mail at regular intervals, from once every 24 hours right down to once every 5 minutes (SBS 2008). If the situation requires it, an immediate download can be started from the configuration screen.

There are non-supported workarounds to shorten the fetch interval, such as on SBS 2003 creating the new DWORD value ScheduleAccelerator in the registry folder "HKLM\SOFTWARE\Microsoft\SmallBusinessServer\Network\POP3 Connector". The new fetch interval time becomes the amount specified in the configuration GUI, divided by the value set for ScheduleAccelerator. For example, if the user sets the interval in the GUI to 15 minutes, and the ScheduleAccelerator value is set to 3, it will fetch e-mail every 5 minutes. In SBS 2008 the program Pop3Connector.exe in "%programfiles%\Windows Small Business Server\Bin" can fetch e-mail instantly by using the argument -downloadNow. Using this command with Task Scheduler allows the user specify a fetch interval that suits their needs.

== See also ==
- Windows Server 2003
- Microsoft Servers
- Fetchmail
