= AI wrapper =

Software layer between an AI model and users

Perplexity AI is a search engine that uses large language models to generate responses to user queries by searching and summarizing web-based content. It is a prominent example for an AI wrapper-based service.

An AI wrapper (or LLM wrapper) is commonly defined as:

- in a technical sense, a software layer that sits between the user and an AI model
- in a broader sense, the entirety of a service or application that is available or distributed to businesses or private users that makes use of (or at-least largely bases on) the latter.

== Purposes ==
The idea behind AI wrapper applications is to make the AI more usable and effective for specific tasks, whether through interface design, prompt engineering or domain-specific data injection that shapes how the underlying model's capabilities reach the end user. Furthermore, wrappers handle the formatting of both user inputs and AI outputs and can even enhance AI capabilities with additional logic or integrations to third-party software (see: AI pipelines, agentic AI).

Instead of requiring the user to interact directly with an AI model's raw API or write specific prompts, wrappers handle the interaction with the technical endpoints of the AI and present the user a polished product.

Start-ups often use wrappers to build applications on top of existing models without training their own, reducing initial development time and cost.

== Functionality ==
On a basic level, an AI wrapper works by utilizing an AI model's API, sending the user's input, along with a (often advanced and long) prompt or instruction telling the model what to do. Additionally, the wrapper software may have adjusted the formatting of the user's input before sending or used retrieval-augmented generation, to enrich the request with company or domain-specific data. Some developers use fine-tuned models to achieve the same customization.

When the model is done answering - thus when the API returns an output - wrappers commonly parse the model's raw response into a desired format appealing to the user.

Some wrappers enable AI models to call external tools, letting the model search databases, call external APIs, execute and debug code or trigger actions in other software. Furthermore, advanced AI wrappers may determine what model to route the input to, depending on complexity and cost, sending simple queries to lighter models and harder tasks to more capable ones.

=== Example ===
For example, a customer service can utilize an AI wrapper that works routes could have a chatbot that integrates business-specific FAQs into its responses.

== Limitations and security concerns ==
Because of their functionality of generating text based on probability, LLMs and wrappers thereof are prone to inaccurate responses

=== Security concerns ===
Wrappers may be susceptible to attacks like prompt leaking and prompt injection, with the risk depending on the complexity and safeguard mechanisms of the ground-lying model.

=== Market viability ===
AI wrappers, bear the risk of drowning in the market, as they are often easy to replicate (see: vibe coding) and may thus have a hard time establishing a unique market position. Especially when providers like OpenAI integrate more functionality directly into their platforms (e.g. PDF-support), the need for standalone wrappers decreases significantly.

=== Dependence on providers ===
A piece of wrapper software is highly dependent on the provider of the ground-lying AI and can quickly break when changes are made to models, API availability or pricing etc.

=== Scalability and maintenance ===
High traffic or scaling attempts can lead a significant rise in API call expenses. Furthermore, the factual accuracy and performance of AI-generated results worsen, when the volume of queries or the complexity of use cases increase. Also, frequent updates to the ground-lying models can break existing wrappers, which can lead to maintenance problems.

=== Domain-specific factual accuracy ===
Large language models perform badly in specialized industries where domain knowledge is critical (healthcare, finance, or legal). Fine-tuning alone may not be sufficient.

=== Ethical and bias concerns ===
Large language models, even wrapped ones, can generate results that favor or discriminate against certain groups of people, as they repeat biases and prejudices apparent in the data they were trained on.

== Prominent examples ==
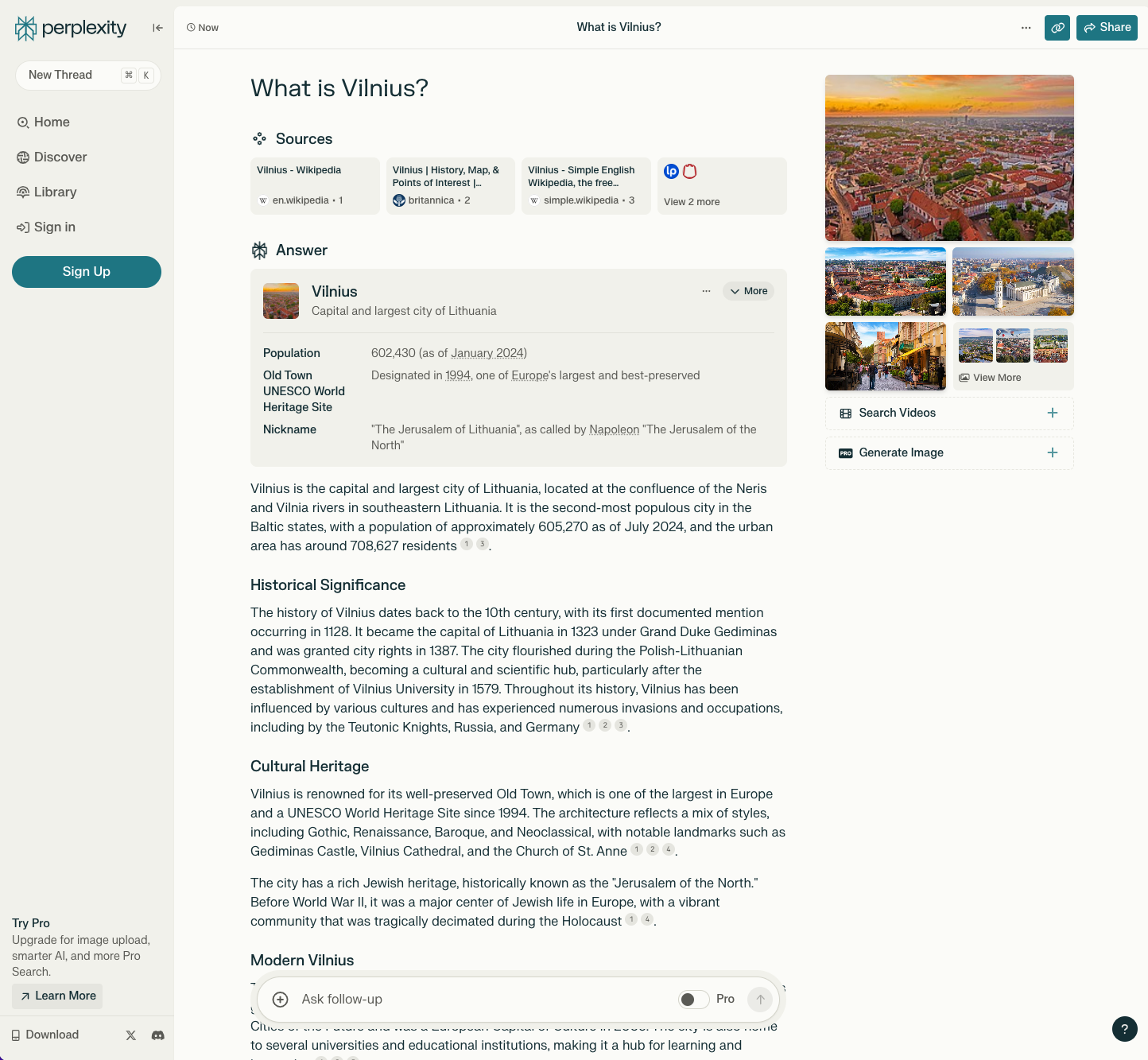
Perplexity AI, when asked "What is Vilnius?"

Perplexity AI is an AI-powered search engine that combines large language models and real-time web search capabilities, to provide responses based on current Internet content, citing sources used. Its real-time search engine is called Sonar and is based on Meta's open-source Llama. A free public version is available, while a paid Pro subscription offers access to more advanced large language models and additional features.

Cursor and GitHub Copilot are AI-wrappers that can produce computer code. Cursor offers access to a range of models including Grok, Claude, and Gemini while GitHub Copilot was initially powered by the OpenAI Codex which is a modified, production version of GPT-3.

== See also ==
- Applications of artificial intelligence
- AI slop
- AI in content creation
