= Message delivery agent =

Computer software that delivers email to a mailbox

A message delivery agent (MDA) or mail delivery agent is a computer software component that is responsible for the delivery of email messages to a local recipient's mailbox. It is also called a local delivery agent (LDA).

Within the Internet mail architecture, local message delivery is achieved through a process of handling messages from the message transfer agent, and storing mail into the recipient's environment (typically a mailbox).

Spam filtering usually occurs at the MDA under modern email architectures.

== Implementation ==
Many mail handling software products bundle multiple message delivery agents with the message transfer agent component, providing for site customization of the specifics of mail delivery to a user.

=== Unix ===
On Unix-like systems, procmail and maildrop are the most popular MDAs. The Local Mail Transfer Protocol (LMTP) is a protocol that is frequently implemented by network-aware MDAs.

==== Invocation ====
The mail delivery agent is generally not started from the command line, but is usually invoked by mail delivery subsystems, such as a mail transport agent, or a mail retrieval agent.

=== Unix-like ===
- Cyrus IMAP - A mail server suite that includes a mail delivery agent
- dovecot - A mail server suite that includes a mail delivery agent
- fetchmail - Primarily a Mail retrieval agent (MRA)
- getmail - simpler, more secure, modern fetchmail alternative
- fdm — modern replacement for both fetchmail and procmail from the author of tmux
- maildrop or courier-maildrop - traditional procmail replacement, part of Courier Mail Server, but can also be used with other mail servers
- procmail - old, but still used
- bin/mail, the MDA part of Sendmail - Sendmail is one of the oldest email packages
- Sieve mail filtering language - a standardised mail filtering language; also, a modern replacement for procmail from the GNU Mailutils package

== See also ==
- Message transfer agent (MTA)
- Mail retrieval agent (MRA)
- Message submission agent (MSA)
- Message user agent (MUA) a.k.a. email client
- E-mail agent (infrastructure) (MxA)
