= Cleancode eMail =

Software utility for sending SMTP email

- Developer: Dean Jones
- Written in: C
- License: GPLv2
- Repository: github.com/deanproxy/eMail

Cleancode eMail (also known as CleanCode Email or simply email) is a simple command line software utility for sending SMTP email. It is portable enough to compile and run under Linux, OS X, BSD, Solaris, Cygwin and perhaps other Unix-like operating systems.

== Features ==
Upon installing the Cleancode eMail, the email executable binary becomes available.

This program offers features for sending email via SMTP. It supports SMTP AUTH (via the LOGIN and PLAIN mechanisms), MIME attachments, an address book, encryption of both transport (via TLS) and message (via PGP), and digital signatures (via PGP). It can be easily used for sending email from the command line, or via shell scripts or other software packages. The lack of modern features helps Cleancode eMail stand out as a fast, efficient and helpful tool for system administrators in Unix-like environments, as that was its intentional purpose when first developed.

== History ==
Cleancode eMail started in September 2001 and is currently still maintained and developed by the original author, Dean Jones.

== See also ==
- mail (Unix)
- mailx
- mutt
