= Simple Mail Access Protocol =

The Simple Mail Access Protocol (SMAP) is an application layer Internet protocol for accessing email stored on a server. It was introduced as part of the Courier suite, with the goal of creating a simpler and more capable alternative to IMAP.

As of 2005, SMAP is still considered experimental, and is only supported by the Courier server and Cone client.

== Features ==
- MIME attachments can be transmitted in their raw, decoded form. This allows large base64-encoded attachments to be transmitted without the 4:3 inflation that base64 encoding usually incurs.
- Support for sending outgoing e-mails through the SMAP connection, instead of using a separate SMTP connection to the server. An outgoing message only needs to be transmitted once to both send it and save a copy to a server-side folder.
- Unicode folder names, with native support for hierarchy.
- SMAP clients and servers can fall back to IMAP if the peer does not support SMAP.

== See also ==
- POP4, another attempt at creating a "simpler IMAP", by extending POP3
