= Temp File Cleaner =

Utility program for Windows

- Developer(s): ADDPCS
- Stable release: 4.4.0
- Operating system: Windows 98 and later
- Type: Utility software
- License: Proprietary, Freeware (for non-commercial use)
- Website: addpcs.com/software/tfc/

Temp File Cleaner (TFC) is a utility program for Microsoft Windows designed to quickly remove temporary and unnecessary files which might otherwise prove difficult to find because of dynamic paths and multiple locations.

== Features ==
TFC's minimalist design and single purpose allow it to have compact installation. As of version 3.1.1, a full installation occupies 3.7MB.

It supports the removal of unnecessary and temporary files created by Google Chrome, Mozilla Firefox, Internet Explorer, and Opera browsers as well as those created in the course of normal system operation such as Windows Updates Cache, Windows Logs, and Windows, Root, and User Temp files which can be created by a variety of programs. In addition, TFC includes the ability to customize its operations to include deeper search of subdirectories, brute force deletion, root path specification, and the addition of more advanced cleaning protocols such as Windows debug files, Hibernation files, and System Restore Data.

TFC allows a "test run" of its operation, offering users the ability to preview the files that would be deleted upon normal execution as well as the amount of space that would be freed.
