= Jeremy Howard (entrepreneur) =

Australian data scientist (born 1973)

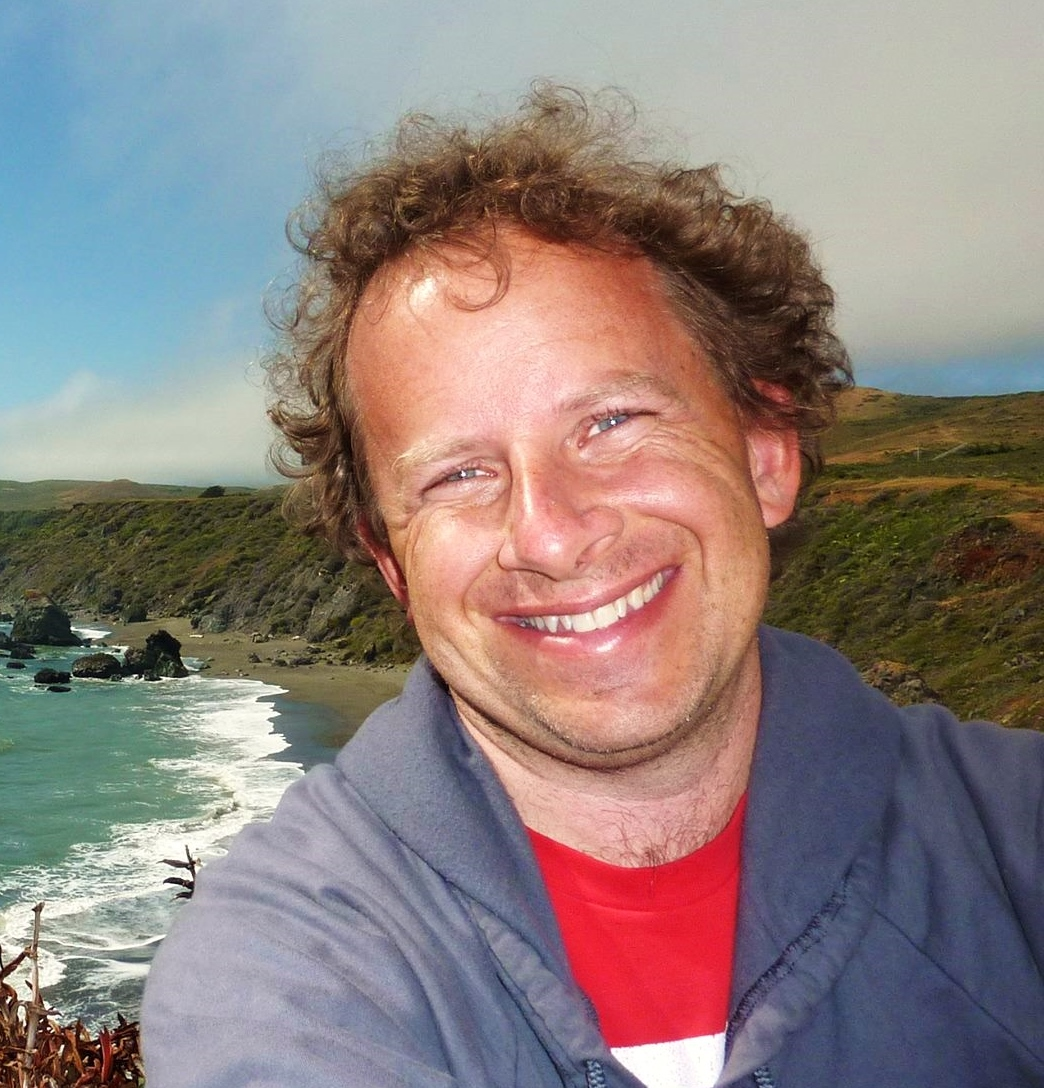
- Born: 13 November 1973 (age 52); London, England
- Education: University of Melbourne
- Occupation: Computer scientist
- Scientific career
- Workplaces: University of San Francisco
- Website: jeremy.fast.ai

Jeremy Howard (born 13 November 1973) is an Australian data scientist, entrepreneur and educator.

He is the co-founder of fast.ai, where he teaches introductory courses, develops software, and conducts research in the area of deep learning.

Previously he founded and led Fastmail, Optimal Decisions Group and Enlitic. He was president and chief scientist of Kaggle.

Early in the COVID-19 epidemic he was a leading advocate for masking.

== Early life ==
Howard was born in London, England, and moved to Melbourne, Australia in 1976. He attended Melbourne Grammar and studied philosophy at the University of Melbourne.

== Career ==
Howard started his career in management consulting, working at McKinsey & Co and AT Kearney. He remained in management consulting for eight years before becoming an entrepreneur.

Early in his career, Howard contributed to open-source projects, particularly the Perl programming language, Cyrus IMAP server, and Postfix SMTP server. He helped develop the Perl language, as chair of the Perl6-data working group, and author of RFCs.

While in Australia, Howard founded two successful startups: the email provider FastMail, which he sold to Opera Software, and the insurance pricing optimization company Optimal Decisions Group (ODG), which he sold to ChoicePoint. Fastmail was one of the first email products that enabled users to integrate their familiar desktop clients.

=== Kaggle ===
Howard first became involved with Kaggle, founded in April 2010, after becoming the globally top-ranked participant in data science competitions in both 2010 and 2011. The competitions that Howard won involved tourism forecasting and predicting the success of grant applications. Howard then became the President and Chief Scientist of Kaggle.

In December 2011, Wired Magazine ran a piece on Howard, calling him 'The Accidental Scientist'. Howard was also interviewed by the McKinsey Quarterly, where he explained that the rapid advance of machine learning presents an economic paradox; while productivity is rising, employment may not. By December 2013, Howard had left his position as President of Kaggle.

=== Enlitic ===
In August 2014, Howard founded Enlitic to use machine learning to make medical diagnostics and clinical decision support tools faster, more accurate, and more accessible. Enlitic uses deep Learning algorithms to diagnose illness and disease. Howard believes that today, machine learning algorithms are actually as good as or better than humans at many things that we think of as being uniquely human capabilities.

Howard taught data science at company Singularity University. He was also a Young Global Leader with the World Economic Forum, and spoke at the World Economic Forum Annual Meeting 2014 on "Jobs For The Machines." Howard advised Khosla Ventures as their Data Strategist, identifying the biggest opportunities for investing in data-driven startups and mentoring their portfolio companies to build data-driven businesses.

=== fast.ai ===
Together with Rachel Thomas, he is the co-founder of fast.ai, a research institute dedicated to make Deep Learning more accessible. He teaches introductory courses, both online and in-person, and at the University of Queensland, where he is honorary professor at the School of Information Technology and Electrical Engineering. Previously he taught at the University of San Francisco, where he was Distinguished Research Scientist. He also develops software, such as the Fastai library.

==== ULMFiT ====
As part of his research in fast.ai he developed the ULMFiT algorithm, which is credited with pioneering transfer learning and fine-tuning techniques in natural language processing, and contributing to the development of modern language models, such as the GPT family.

== Personal life and interests ==
Howard used Spaced Repetitive Learning to develop usable Chinese language skills in just one year. He has mentored and advised many startups, and is also an angel investor. He has contributed to a range of open-source projects as a developer, and was a regular guest expert on Australia's most popular TV morning news program Sunrise.
