= Mail (Unix) =

Command-line email client for Unix

mail
- Developer: AT&T Bell Laboratories
- Initial release: November 3, 1971; 54 years ago
- Operating system: Unix, Unix-like, V
- Type: Command

mail is a command-line email client for Unix and Unix-like operating systems.

== History ==
"Electronic mail was there from the start", Douglas McIlroy writes in his article "A Research UNIX Reader: Annotated Excerpts from the Programmer’s Manual, 1971-1986", and so a mail command was included in the first released version of research Unix, First Edition Unix. This version of mail was capable of sending (append) messages to the mailboxes of other users on Unix systems, and it helped manage (read) the mailbox of the current user.

In 1978 Kurt Shoens wrote a completely new version of mail for BSD 2, referred to as Berkeley Mail. Although initially installed at /usr/ucb/Mail, (with the earlier Unix mail still available at /bin/mail), on most modern Unix and Linux systems the commands Mail, mail and/or mailx all invoke a descendant of this Berkeley Mail, which much later was the base for the standardization of a mail program by the OpenGroup, the POSIX standardized variant mailx.

== See also ==
- Cleancode email
- mailx
