= Timo Sirainen =

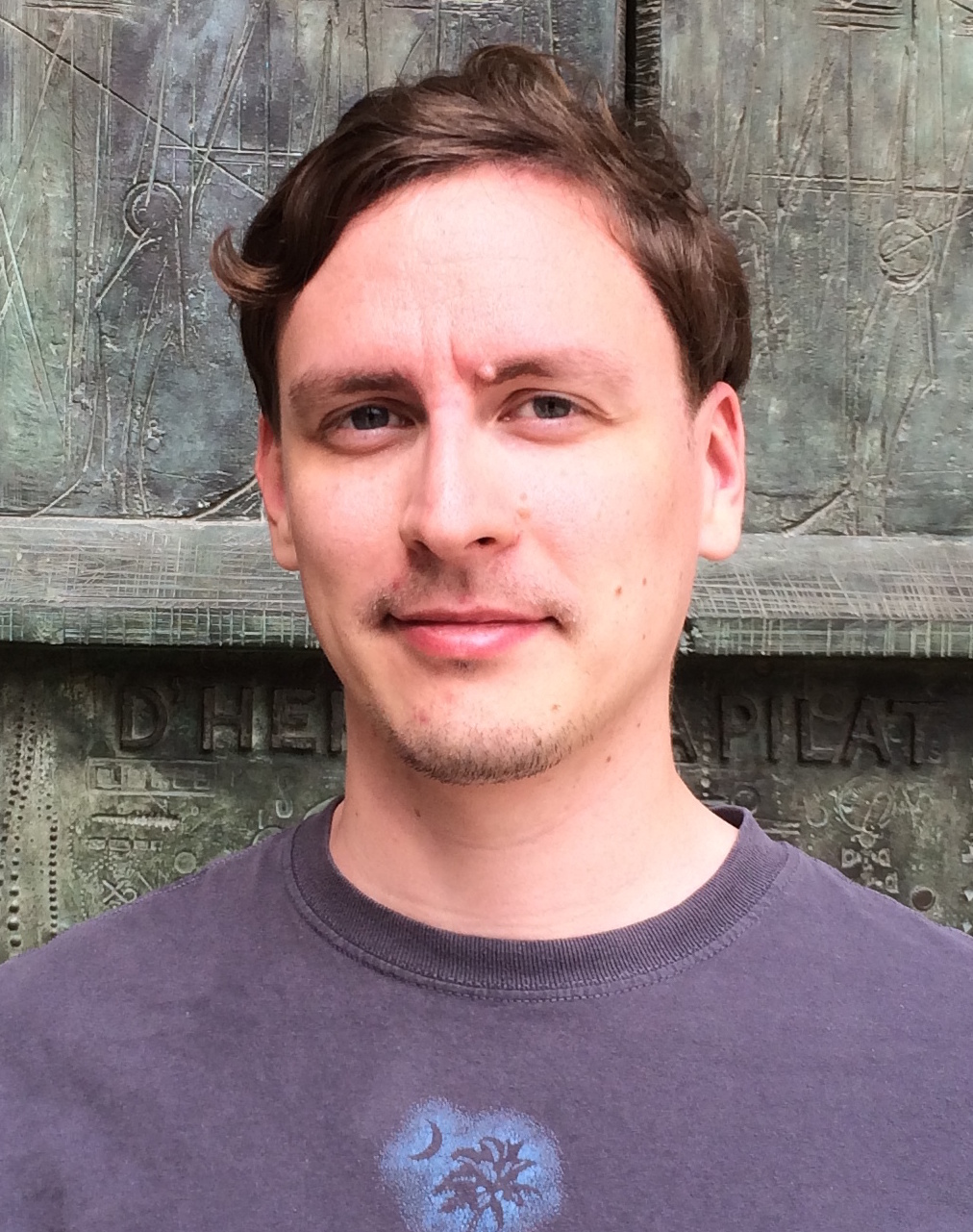
- Timo Sirainen at Sagrada Família
- Employer: Open-Xchange
- Spouse: Vilma Sirainen

Timo Sirainen, born in 1979, is a Finnish programmer also known under the handles "cras" and "tss". Sirainen is the original author of the IRC-client Irssi and the POP/IMAP server Dovecot. Sirainen lives in Helsinki, Finland.

In 2006 Sirainen began studying biotechnology at the University of Tampere.

He formerly worked for Rackspace Email & Apps (formerly Mailtrust), where he continued the development of the Dovecot POP/IMAP server.

Since May 2011 he has run his own company offering commercial support for Dovecot. In March 2015, the companies Dovecot Oy and Open-Xchange SA announced a merger.
