= Temporary file =

Computer file type

A temporary file is a file created to store information temporarily, either for a program's intermediate use or for transfer to a permanent file when complete. It may be created by computer programs for a variety of purposes, such as when a program cannot allocate enough memory for its tasks, when the program is working on data bigger than the architecture's address space, or as a primitive form of inter-process communication.

== Auxiliary memory ==
Modern operating systems employ virtual memory, however programs that use large amounts of data (e.g. video) may need to create temporary file(s).

== Inter-process communication ==
Most operating systems offer primitives such as pipes, sockets or shared memory to pass data among programs, but often the simplest way (especially for programs that follow the Unix philosophy) is to write data into a temporary file and inform the receiving program of the location of the temporary file.

== Creation ==
Operating systems and programming languages typically provide functions for obtaining unique temporary file names.

On POSIX systems, temporary files can be safely created with the mkstemp or tmpfile library functions. Some systems provide the former POSIX (now removed) mktemp(1) program. These files are typically located in the standard temporary directory, /tmp on Unix machines or %TEMP% (which is log-in specific) on Windows machines.

A temporary file created with tmpfile is deleted automatically when the program exits or the file is closed. To generate a temporary file name that will survive past the lifespan of the creating program, tmpnam (POSIX) or GetTempFileName(...) (Windows) can be used.

PHP has the tmpfile function.

Python has the tempfile module.

Rust has the third-party crate tempfile.

.NET has the Path.GetTempFileName method.

== Issues ==
Some programs create temporary files and then leave them behind - they do not delete them. This can happen because the program crashed or the developer of the program simply forgot to add the code needed to delete the temporary files after the program is done with them. The temporary files left behind can accumulate over time and consume a lot of disk space.

Temporary files may be deleted manually. Operating systems may clear out the temporary directory on a reboot, and they may have "cleaner" scripts that remove files if they have not been accessed in a certain amount of time. Also, memory-based filesystems, such as tmpfs, inherently do not preserve files across a reboot.

== See also ==
- Temp File Cleaner
- Temporary folder
- Temporary filesystem
- Temporary variable
