= Fast.ai =

Nonprofit deep learning and AI research group

fast.ai
- Industry: Artificial intelligence
- Founded: October 2016
- Founders: Jeremy Howard, Rachel Thomas
- Key people: Jeremy Howard, Rachel Thomas, Sylvain Gugger
- Website: www.fast.ai

fast.ai is a non-profit research group focused on deep learning and artificial intelligence. It was founded in 2016 by Jeremy Howard and Rachel Thomas with the goal of democratizing deep learning. They do this by providing a massive open online course (MOOC) named "Practical Deep Learning for Coders," which has no other prerequisites except for knowledge of the programming language Python.

== Massive Open Online Course ==
The free MOOC "Practical Deep Learning for Coders" is available as recorded videos, initially taught by Howard and Thomas at the University of San Francisco. In contrast to other online learning platforms such as Coursera or Udemy, a certificate is not granted to those successfully finishing the course online. Only the students following the in-person classes can obtain a certificate from the University of San Francisco.

The MOOC consists of two parts, each containing seven lessons. Topics include image classification, stochastic gradient descent, natural language processing (NLP), and various deep learning architectures such as convolutional neural networks (CNNs), recursive neural networks (RNNs) and generative adversarial networks (GANs).

== Applications and alumni ==
- In 2018, students of fast.ai participated in the Stanford’s DAWNBench challenge alongside big tech companies such as Google and Intel. While Google could obtain an edge in some challenges due to its highly specialized TPU chips, the CIFAR-10 challenge was won by the fast.ai students, programming the fastest and cheapest algorithms.
- As a fast.ai student, alumna Sara Hooker created software to detect illegal deforestation. She later became a founding member of Google AI in Accra, Ghana—the first AI research office in Africa.

== Software ==
In the fall of 2018, fast.ai released v1.0 of their free open-source library for deep learning called fastai (without a period), sitting atop PyTorch. Google Cloud was the first to announce its support. This open-source framework is hosted on GitHub and is licensed under the Apache License, Version 2.0.

== See also ==
- Comparison of deep learning software
- Comparison of machine learning software
- fastText – machine learning library
- Lists of open-source artificial intelligence software
- List of Python machine learning and deep learning software
