= Courier Mail Server =

Mail transfer agent server software

- Original author(s): Sam Varshavchik
- Initial release: May 2000; 24 years ago
- Stable release: 1.3.4 / 29 August 2023; 18 months ago
- Repository: github.com/svarshavchik/courier.git
- Written in: C, C++, Perl
- Operating system: All POSIX (Linux, Mac OS X, FreeBSD, Solaris)
- Type: Mail transfer agent
- License: GPL
- Website: www.courier-mta.org

The Courier Mail Server is a mail transfer agent (MTA) server that provides SMTP, IMAP, POP3, SMAP, webmail, and mailing list services with individual components. It is best known for its IMAP server component.

Courier can function as an intermediate mail relay, between an internal LAN and the Internet, or perform final delivery to mailboxes. Courier uses maildirs as its native storage format and can also deliver mail to legacy mailbox files. Configuration files are in plain text format and may include Perl scripts.

Courier can provide mail services for regular operating system accounts. Courier can also provide mail services for virtual mail accounts, managed by any of LDAP directory service, Berkeley DB, MySQL or PostgreSQL authentication database.

Parts of Courier, such as the maildrop filtering system, the webmail and IMAP server, can also be installed as independent packages which can be used with other mail servers. Courier-IMAP is a particularly popular combination with Qmail, Exim, and Postfix servers that are configured to use maildirs.

Courier's source compiles on most POSIX-based operating systems based on Linux and BSD-derived kernels. It uses SMTP extensions for list management and spam filtering.

== See also ==
- Comparison of mail servers
