= CardDAV =

Address book client/server protocol

- Communication protocol
- OSI layer: Application
- Port(s): 80, 443
- RFC(s): 6352

vCard Extensions to WebDAV (CardDAV) is an address book client/server protocol designed to allow users to access and share contact data on a server.

The CardDAV protocol was developed by the IETF and was published as RFC 6352 in August 2011. CardDAV is based on WebDAV, which is based on HTTP, and it uses vCard for contact data.

== History ==
CardDAV was proposed as an open standard for contact management in August 2011. It became known as a synchronization protocol in iOS 7, among other things, and is now also supported by Gmail, where it replaces the no longer supported (by Google) ActiveSync standard.

In October 2013, the standard received an update that made it possible to capture higher-resolution contact images and achieve lower data consumption.

== Specification ==
The specification has been proposed as a standard by IETF as the RFC 6352 in August 2011 by C. Daboo from Apple Inc.

== See also ==
- CalDAV
- Exchange ActiveSync
- SyncML
- vCard
- WebDAV
- JMAP
