= Mailx =

Command-line email client for Unix

mailx is a Unix utility program for sending and receiving mail, also known as a Mail User Agent program. Being a console application with a command syntax similar to ed, it is the POSIX standardized variant of the Berkeley Mail utility.

== See also ==
- mail (Unix)
