= Email filtering =

Processing of email to organize it according to specified criteria

Email filtering is the processing of email to organize it according to specified criteria. The term can apply to the intervention of human intelligence, but most often refers to the automatic processing of messages at an SMTP server, possibly applying anti-spam techniques. Filtering can be applied to incoming emails as well as to outgoing ones.

Depending on the calling environment, email filtering software can reject an item at the initial SMTP connection stage or pass it through unchanged for delivery to the user's mailbox. It is also possible to redirect the message for delivery elsewhere, quarantine it for further checking, modify it or 'tag' it in any other way.

== Motivation ==
Common uses for mail filters include organizing incoming email and removal of spam and computer viruses. Mailbox providers filter outgoing email to promptly react to spam surges that may result from compromised accounts. A less common use is to inspect outgoing email at some companies to ensure that employees comply with appropriate policies and laws. Users might also employ a mail filter to prioritize messages, and to sort them into folders based on subject matter or other criteria.

== Methods ==
Mailbox providers can also install mail filters in their mail transfer agents as a service to all of their customers. Anti-virus, anti-spam, URL filtering, and authentication-based rejections are common filter types.

Corporations often use filters to protect their employees and their information technology assets. A catch-all filter will "catch all" of the emails addressed to the domain that do not exist in the mail server - this can help avoid losing emails due to misspelling.

Users, may be able to install separate programs (see links below), or configure filtering as part of their email program (email client). In email programs, users can make personal, "manual" filters that then automatically filter mail according to the chosen criteria.

== Inbound and outbound filtering ==
Mail filters can operate on inbound and outbound email traffic. Inbound email filtering involves scanning messages from the Internet addressed to users protected by the filtering system or for lawful interception. Outbound email filtering involves the reverse - scanning email messages from local users before any potentially harmful messages can be delivered to others on the Internet. One method of outbound email filtering that is commonly used by Internet service providers is transparent SMTP proxying, in which email traffic is intercepted and filtered via a transparent proxy within the network. Outbound filtering can also take place in an email server. Many corporations employ data leak prevention technology in their outbound mail servers to prevent the leakage of sensitive information via email.

== Customization ==
Mail filters have varying degrees of configurability. Sometimes they make decisions based on matching a regular expression. Other times, code may match keywords in the message body, or perhaps the email address of the sender of the message. More complex control flow and logic is possible with programming languages; this is typically implemented with a data-driven programming language, such as procmail, which specifies conditions to match and actions to take on matching, which may involve further matching. Some more advanced filters, particularly anti-spam filters, use statistical document classification techniques such as the naive Bayes classifier while others use natural language processing to organize incoming emails. Image filtering can use complex image-analysis algorithms to detect skin-tones and specific body shapes normally associated with pornographic images.

Microsoft Outlook includes user-generated email filters called "rules".

== See also ==
- Bayesian spam filtering
- CRM114
- Information filtering
- Markovian discrimination
- Outbound Spam Protection
- Sieve (mail filtering language) is an RFC standard for describing mail filters
- White list#Email whitelists
