= Mbox =

Family of email-related file formats

MBOX is a generic term for a family of related file formats used for holding collections of email messages. It was first implemented in Fifth Edition Unix.

All messages in an MBOX (mailbox) file are concatenated and stored as plain text in a single file. Each message starts with the four characters "From" followed by a space (the so-called "From_ line") and the sender's email address. RFC 4155 defines that a UTC timestamp follows after another separating space character.

A format similar to mbox is the MH Message Handling System. Other systems, such as Microsoft Exchange Server and the Cyrus IMAP server, store mailboxes in centralized databases managed by the mail system and not directly accessible by individual users. The maildir mailbox format is often cited as an alternative to the mbox format for networked email storage systems.

== Mail storage protocols ==
Unlike the Internet protocols used for the exchange of email, the format used for the storage of email has never been formally defined through the RFC standardization mechanism and has been entirely left to the developer of an email client. However, the POSIX standard defined a loose framework in conjunction with the mailx program. In 2005, the application/mbox media type was standardized as RFC 4155, which hinted that mbox stores mailbox messages in their original Internet Message (RFC 2822) format, except for the used newline character, seven-bit clean data storage, and the requirement that each newly added message is terminated with a completely empty line within the mbox database.

== MBOX family ==
The mbox format uses a single blank line followed by the string 'From ' (with a space) to delimit messages; this can create ambiguities if a message contains the same sequence in the message text.

Over the years, four popular but incompatible variants arose: mboxo, mboxrd, mboxcl, and mboxcl2. The naming scheme was developed by Daniel J. Bernstein, Rahul Dhesi, and others in 1996. Each originated from a different version of Unix. mboxcl and mboxcl2 originated from the file format used by Unix System V Release 4 mail tools. mboxrd was invented by Rahul Dhesi et al. as a rationalization of mboxo and subsequently adopted by some Unix mail tools including qmail.

All these variants have the problem that the content of the message sometimes must be modified to remove ambiguities, as shown below, so that applications have to know which quoting rule has been used to perform the correct reversion, which turned out to be impractical. Using MIME and choosing a content-transfer-encoding that quotes "From_" lines in a standard-compliant fashion ensures that message content doesn't need to be changed, but only their MIME representation. Therefore, checksums remain constant, a necessary precondition for supporting S/MIME and Pretty Good Privacy. Applications that newly create messages and store them in mbox database files will likely use this approach to detach message content from database storage format.

mboxo and mboxrd locate the message start by scanning for From lines that are found before the email message headers. If a "From " string occurs at the beginning of a line in either the header or the body of a message (a mail standard violation for the former, but not for the latter), the email message must be modified before the message is stored in an mbox mailbox file or the line will be taken as a message boundary. To avoid misinterpreting a "From " string at the beginning of the line in the email body as the beginning of a new email, some systems "From-munge" the message, typically by prepending a greater-than sign:

   >From my point of view...

In the mboxo format, such lines have irreversible ambiguity. In the mboxo format, this can lead to corruption of the message. If a line already contained >From at the beginning (such as in a quotation), it is unchanged when written. When subsequently read by the mail software, the leading > is erroneously removed. The mboxrd format solves this by converting From to >From and converting >From to >>From , etc. The transformation is then always reversible.

Example:

From MAILER-DAEMON Fri Jul  8 12:08:34 2011
From: Author <author@example.com>
To: Recipient <recipient@example.com>
Subject: Sample message 1
 
This is the body.
>From (should be escaped).
There are 3 lines.
 
From MAILER-DAEMON Fri Jul  8 12:08:34 2011
From: Author <author@example.com>
To: Recipient <recipient@example.com>
Subject: Sample message 2
 
This is the second body.

The mboxcl and mboxcl2 formats use a Content-Length: header to determine the messages' lengths and thereby the next real From line. mboxcl still quotes From lines in the messages themselves as mboxrd does, while mboxcl2 doesn't.

=== Modified mbox ===
Some email clients use a modification of the mbox format for their mail folders.

- Eudora used an mboxo variation where a sender's email address is replaced by the constant string "???@???". Most mbox clients store incoming messages as received. Eudora separates out attachments embedded in the message, storing the attachments as separate individual files in one folder.
- The Mozilla family of email clients (Mozilla, Netscape, Thunderbird, et al.) use an mboxrd variation with more complex From line quoting rules.

== File locking ==
Because more than one messages are stored in a single file, some form of file locking is needed to avoid the corruption that can result from two or more processes modifying the mailbox simultaneously. This could happen if a network email delivery program delivers a new message at the same time as a mail reader is deleting an existing message.

Various mutually incompatible mechanisms have been used by different mbox formats to enable message file locking, including fcntl() and lockf(). This does not work well with network mounted file systems, such as the Network File System (NFS), which is why traditionally Unix used additional "dot lock" files, which could be created atomically even over NFS.

Mbox files should also be locked while they are being read. Otherwise, the reader may see corrupted message contents if another process is modifying the mbox at the same time, even though no actual file corruption occurs.

== As a patch format ==
In open source development, it is common to send patches in the diff format to a mailing list for discussion. The diff format allows for irrelevant "headers", such as mbox data, to be added. Version control systems like git have support for generating mbox-formatted patches and for sending them to the list as emails in a thread.

== As an email interchange format ==
The MBOX format is also used as an interchange and archival format for email messages. Because MBOX stores multiple email messages sequentially in a single plain-text file, it is commonly used for exporting, transferring, and archiving mailbox data between different email systems. Each message in an MBOX file contains complete message headers and MIME-encoded content, allowing email data to be preserved independently of the originating email client.

== See also ==
- Maildir
- MIX (email)
- MH Message Handling System
