= Nokia 2610 =

2006 cell phone model

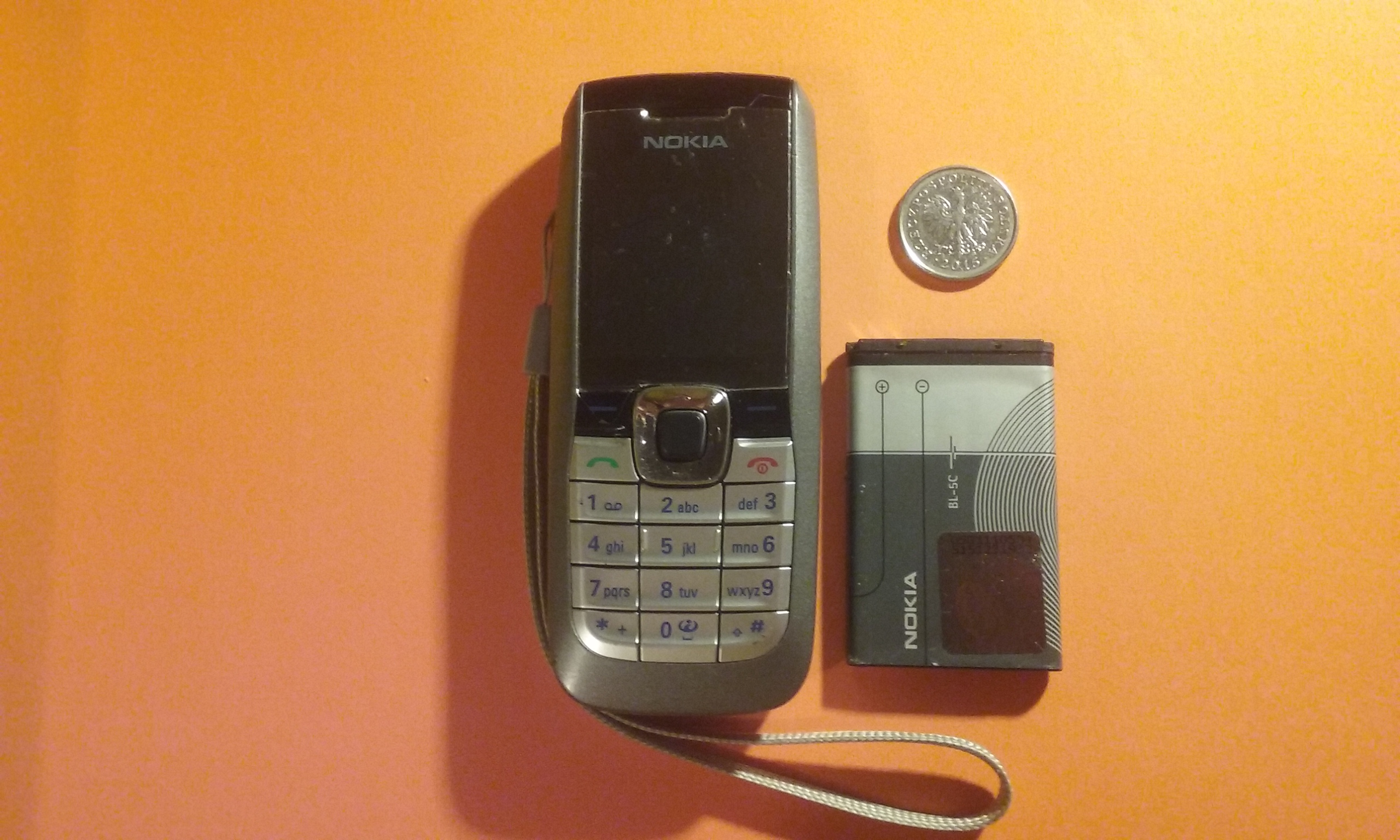
- Predecessor: Nokia 2600
- Successor: Nokia 2630; Nokia 2600 classic
- Related: Nokia 2310; Nokia 2626
- Compatible networks: GSM 900/1800; GSM 850/1900 (North American version)
- Form factor: Candybar
- Dimensions: 104×43×18 mm (4.09×1.69×0.71 in)
- Weight: 91 g (3 oz)
- Operating system: Nokia OS (Series 40 user interface)
- Memory: 3 MB internal memory
- Battery: 970–1020 mAh Li-ion
- Display: 1.5 in CSTN; 128x128 pixels 65,536 colours
- Connectivity: GPRS

The Nokia 2610, released in March 2006, is a mobile phone manufactured by Nokia.

== Design ==
The Nokia 2610 is a candybar-style telephone that weighs 91 grams, with its buttons operated by the thumb. It has a 1.5-inch (38 mm) CSTN colour screen with 65,536-colour display. It uses a D-pad and two selection buttons, one on each side, with Send and End keys similar to native S40 devices. The End key also is used to turn the telephone on and off.

== Specifications ==
=== Networks ===
- RH-86: GSM 900/1800 (EU/Asia)
- RH-87: GSM 850/1900 (North America)

=== Entertainment ===
- Java games
- Preinstalled Coin Flipping & Nature Park games

=== Internet ===
- XHTML browser, WAP 2.0
- E-mail (POP3, IMAP4 and SMTP), with Push e-mail available for IMAP4

=== Connectivity ===
- GPRS

=== Storage ===
- 3 MB Internal Flash memory

=== Dimensions ===
- 104 x 43 x 18 mm

=== Operating system ===
- Nokia OS, S40 user interface

=== Display ===
- 1.5 in CSTN
- 65,536 colours

=== Battery ===
- Li-ion, model BL-5C, 970–1020 mAh
