= Nokia 2630 =

2007 cell phone model

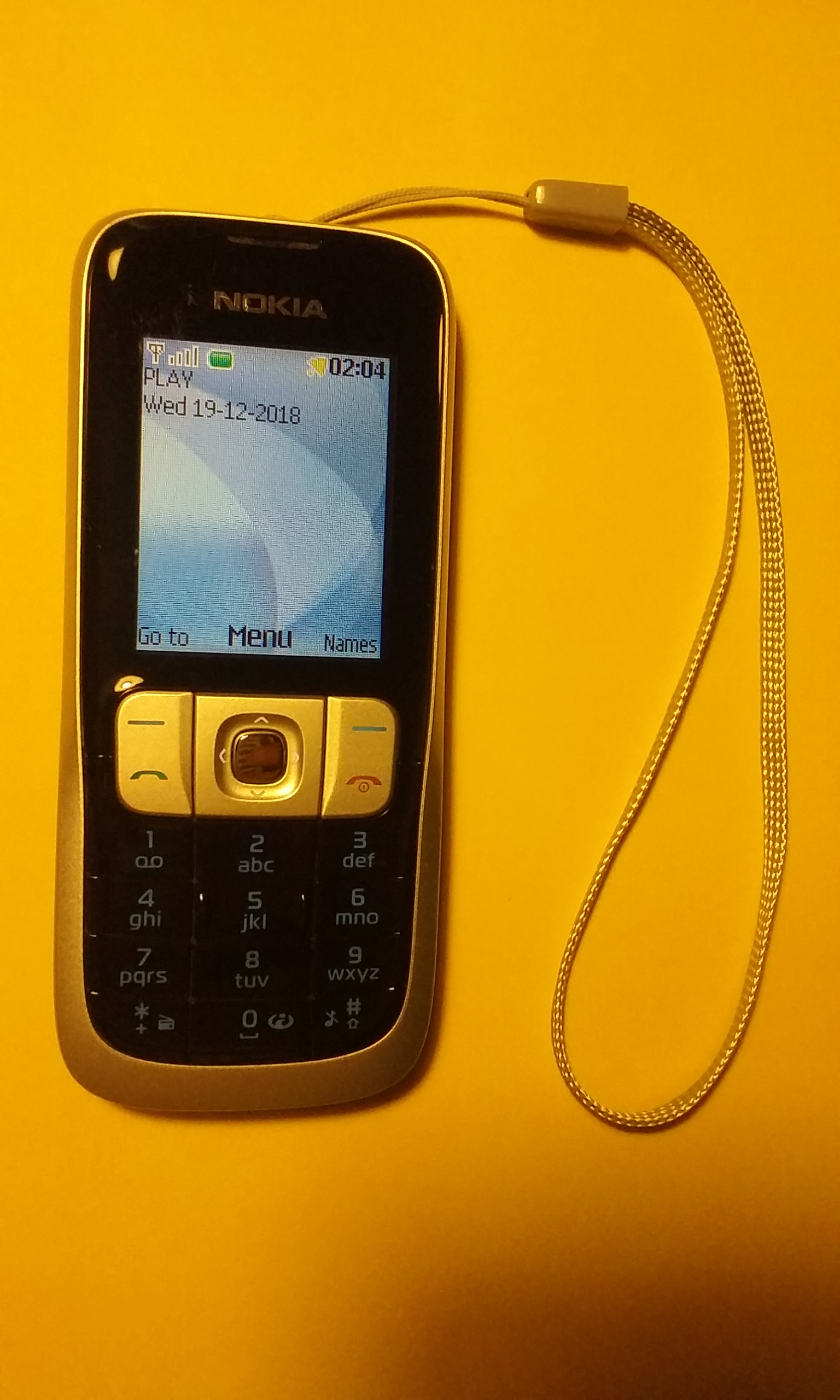
- Manufacturer: Nokia
- First released: 3 May 2007
- Predecessor: Nokia 2610
- Successor: Nokia 2690; Nokia 2700 classic Nokia 2730 classic Nokia C1-01
- Related: Nokia 3500 classic Nokia 3110 classic Nokia 2600 classic Nokia 1680 classic
- Compatible networks: GSM 900 1800; GSM 850 1900 (US)
- Form factor: candy bar
- Dimensions: 105 mm (4.1 in) H 45 mm (1.8 in) W 9.9 mm (0.39 in) D, 45 cc
- Weight: 66 g (2.3 oz)
- Memory: 11 MB internal memory, no card slot
- Rear camera: 0.3 MP (640x480 px max.); 4x digital zoom VGA video recording (128x96 px max.)
- Display: 1.8 in (46 mm) diagonal TFT LCD; 128x160 pixels, 65,536 Colour TFT LCD
- Sound: Polyphonic ringtones 24 voices, Real tone (MP3)
- Connectivity: GPRS, Bluetooth
- Data inputs: Keypad
- Other: FM radio

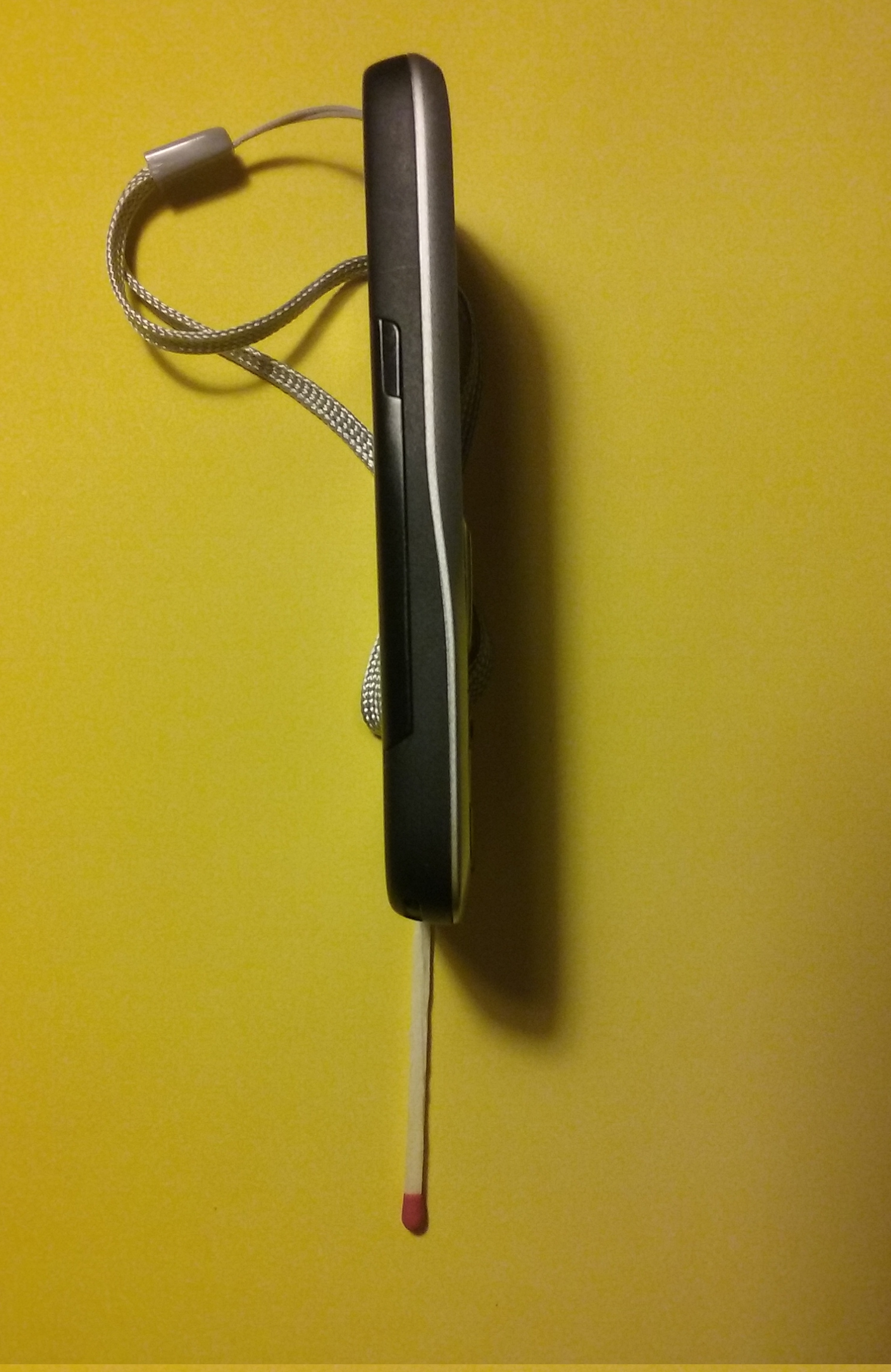
Nokia 2630 side view

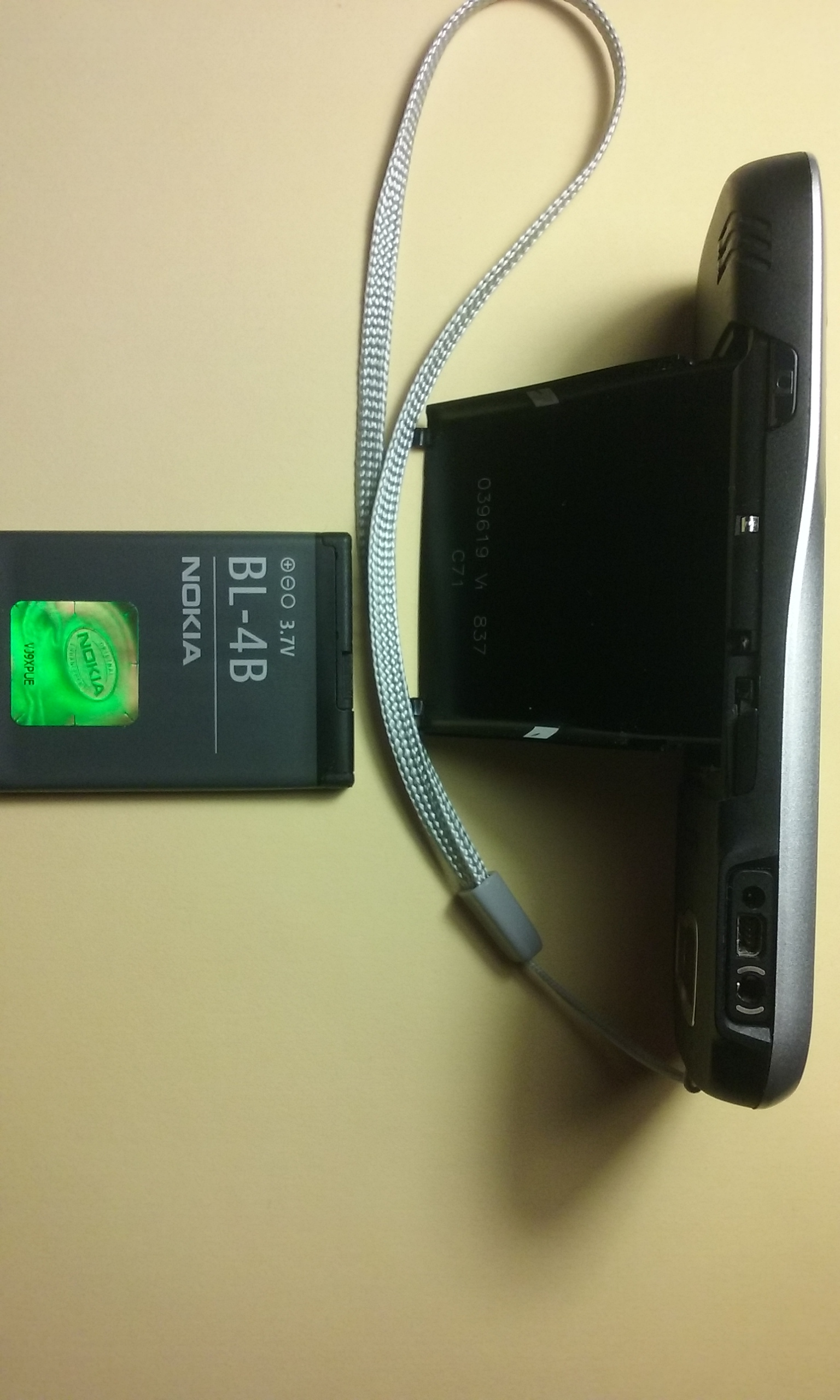
Nokia 2630 with visible slots and battery BL-4B

The Nokia 2630, released in July 2007, is a basic mobile phone developed by Nokia.

The 2630 is a basic but decent and feature-packed phone containing all the features of its predecessor Nokia 2610, including a VGA camera and improved design and display. It was notable for being the thinnest Nokia phone at the time, less than one centimetre thick, and with tiny dimensions overall and a very low weight of 66 grams.

The EU/Asia version was manufactured at Nokia factories in Romania and China, while the US version was in Mexico instead.

== Design ==
The 2630 is a candybar style phone that weighs 66 grams, with its buttons operated by the thumb. It has a 1.8 inch TFT color screen with 65536 colors display all the information of the cellphone. Uses a d-pad and two selection button on each side with a send and end key like native S40 devices. The End key is also used to turn the phone on/off. The phone also has a 640x480 pixels, VGA camera phone on the back.

== Specifications ==
- Camera: 640x480 (VGA; 3 sizes: 640x480, 320x240, 160x120; x4 digital zoom, Night Mode, Multishot, 128x96 video recording)
- Connectivity: GSM 850/1900 (RM-299 for Mexico, Central & South America), 900/1800 (RM-298 for EU/Asia); EDGE, Bluetooth
- Entertainment: Radio, MP3, AMR, MP4, 3GP, MIDI, WAV (16 kHz), 3GPP
- Pre-installed games: Phantom Spider, Snake EX2 and Sudoku
- Software: Series 40 user interface with Java MIDP 2.0
- Email (POP3 and IMAP4, push e-mail available for IMAP4)
- Display: 1.8-inch 128x160 TFT at 65536 colors
- SAR value: 2.6g

== See also ==
- Sony Ericsson W880i
- Nokia 6500 classic
- Nokia 5310 XpressMusic
