= Alpine (email client) =

Email client

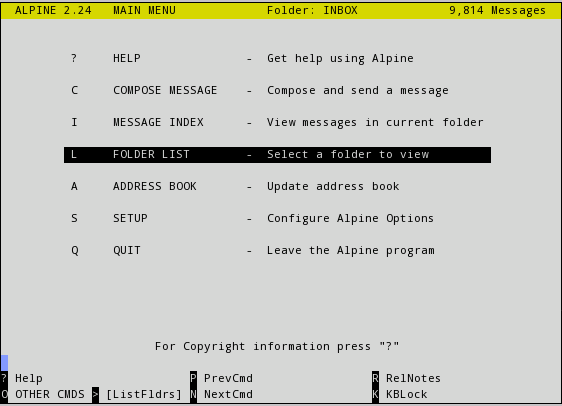
- Main menu of Alpine 2.24 in color
- Developers: University of Washington (2007–2009); re-alpine group (2009–2012); Eduardo Chappa (2013–present)
- Initial release: December 20, 2007; 18 years ago
- Stable release: 2.26 / 2 June 2022
- Written in: C
- Predecessor: Pine
- Available in: English
- Type: Email client
- License: Apache-2.0
- Website: alpineapp.email
- Repository: repo.or.cz/alpine.git

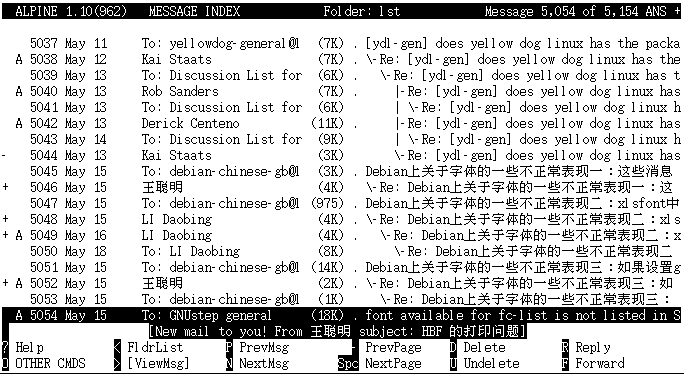
Alpine's message index screen, showing its support for Unicode characters, in this case Simplified Chinese characters.

Alpine is a free software email client developed at the University of Washington.

Alpine is a rewrite of the Pine Message System that adds support for Unicode and other features. Alpine is meant to be suitable for both inexperienced email users and the most demanding of power users. Alpine can be learned by exploration and the use of context-sensitive help. The user interface can be customized.

== Features ==
Alpine shares many common features of console applications, like a rich set of shortcut keys, using a keyboard instead of a mouse for all navigation and operations. In fact, all operations in Alpine have corresponding shortcut keys.

Unlike other console applications targeting developers and experienced users, which often require users to edit a configuration file, Alpine lets users change most configuration options within the software. This makes alpine one of the most easy to learn console-based email clients.

Alpine supports IMAP, POP, SMTP, NNTP and LDAP protocols natively. Although it does not support composing HTML email, it can display emails that only have HTML content as text. Alpine can read and write to folders in several formats, including Maildir, mbox, the mh format used by the mh message handling system, mbx, and MIX.

Alpine includes its own editor Pico (Pico stands for PIne COmposer), which includes commands for basic editing of files, such as, search and replace, spelling, and justifying of text, besides cut and paste, and intuitive navigation commands. However, any editor can be used to compose messages in Alpine, using the Editor configuration variable.

Besides being able to set up an alternative editor, users can configure more than a hundred variables and options to their liking, including setting up configuration for sending and receiving e-mail from different services, through an Incoming Folders collection and the use of personalities (called roles in Alpine), and therefore a user can share the same address book between different accounts. Alpine can also sort individual folders by several criteria, including threading, original sender, recipient, and size. Alpine also allows users to configure colors, filters, scores, and character set of the display among others. The configuration and address books can be saved locally or on a remote IMAP server where they are accessible from different computers. Alpine also handles encrypted and signed messages using the S/MIME standard.

Although Alpine was designed to be accessible to beginners, it can easily be set up for more advanced users. All screens in Alpine include built-in help, which can quickly be accessed with the CTRL-G command.

== History ==
=== University of Washington ===
Alpine 1.0 was publicly released on December 20, 2007.

On 4 August 2008, the UW Alpine team announced that after one more release, incorporating Web Alpine 2.0, they would "shift [their] effort from direct development into more of a consultation and coordination role to help integrate contributions from the community." This was taken to mean that UW no longer maintains Alpine, and left development to others.

=== re-alpine fork ===
In June 2009, a project named re-alpine was created on SourceForge. This was used as an upstream for patches from maintainers. In August 2013, the re-alpine project official announced the December 21, 2012, release of Re-alpine 2.03, their last official release.

=== Current ===
Since January 2013, Eduardo Chappa, an active software developer formerly from the University of Washington, has released newer versions of Alpine from his site. His announcement was made public on the Usenet newsgroup comp.mail.pine. Most major Unix-like systems currently use this as the primary upstream site. On March 17, 2017, Chappa announced the release of version 2.21. Version 2.22 was released on January 19, 2020. Version 2.23 was released on June 19, 2020. Version 2.24 was released on October 10, 2020. Version 2.25 was released on September 18, 2021.

The latest stable released version, 2.26, was released on June 2, 2022 while the most recent developmental version, 2.29.99, was released on May 2, 2026.

== Name ==
"Alpine" officially stands for Alternatively Licensed Program for Internet News and Email. UW has also referred to it as "Apache Licensed Pine".

== License ==
Alpine is licensed under the Apache License (version 2 – November 29, 2006), and saw its first public alpha release December 20, 2007. This milestone was a new approach, since the alpha test of Pine was always non-public.

== See also ==
- Comparison of email clients
- Text-based email client
- UW IMAP
