= MBX =

MBX may refer to:

- Maribor Airport - the IATA Airport Code for Maribor Airport
- MBX/MBX50 - A motorcycle manufactured by Honda
- mbx - A mailbox format supported by the UW-IMAP server
- Milton-Bradley MBX - A short-lived add-on (expansion) system made by Milton-Bradley for the TI-99
