= Messaging Architects =

Software company in Canada

- Industry: Internet, computer software
- Headquarters: 180 Peel Street, Suite 333; Montreal, Quebec, Canada
- Area served: Worldwide
- Website: www.messagingarchitects.com

Messaging Architects (MA) is a Canadian software company specializing in e-mail products. Their flagship product is Netmail, an integrated email management platform.

== History ==
The company launched in March 1995 as ChronoFAX, a distributor of computer-based fax software. ChronoFAX became Tobit Software North America as a result of a partnership with a German company called Tobit that produced fax software for the Novell NetWare and GroupWise markets. When the three-and-a-half-year partnership with Tobit ended, the company was again renamed to Messaging Architects.

Messaging Architects initially provided add-ons for Novell GroupWise messaging platform. Now, the company offers an integrated email management platform named Netmail. Netmail consolidates the company's portfolio of email software including Netmail Secure (formerly GWGuardian and M+Guardian), Netmail Archive (formerly M+Archive), Netmail Search, Netmail Migrate (formerly Migrator), and Netmail Store (formerly M+SecureStore). The company also provides email platform migration services. Messaging Architects claims to have a Professional Services Team with full Novell and Microsoft Exchange certification. Messaging Architects works with messaging platform providers to provide solutions for Microsoft Exchange, Novell GroupWise, and Lotus Notes.

From late 2008 Mark Crispin, inventor of IMAP, who worked at Messaging Architects as a Senior Software Engineer, developing an entirely new IMAP server based upon a distributed mail store, and extending the MIX format.

== Services ==
Messaging Architects also offers a range of remote and on-site services for managing email risk and the co-existence of different email platforms including professional services, email migration services, email consulting, and email policy training.
