= Hula (software) =

Mail and calendar software project

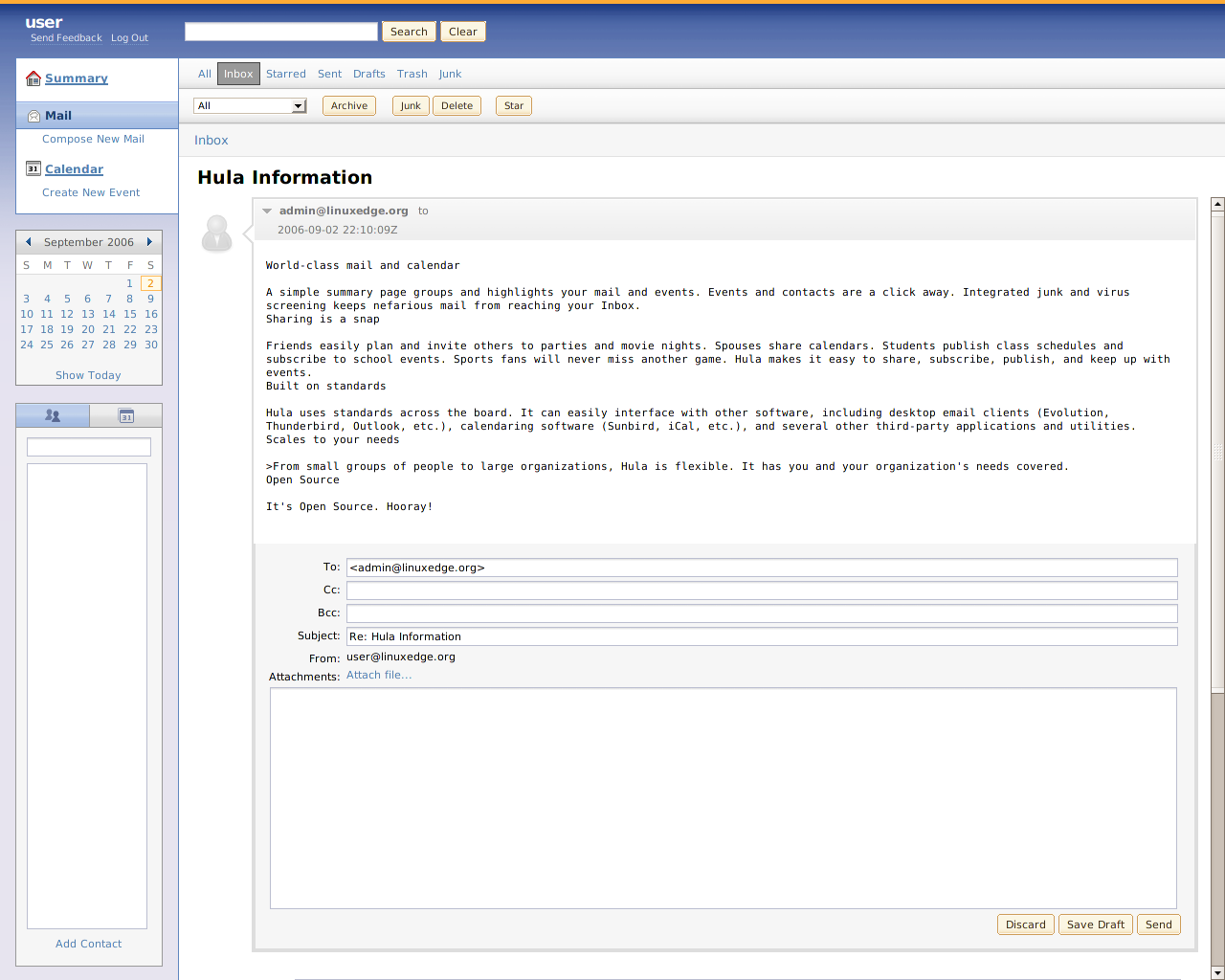
- Hula's webmail interface
- Developer: Novell (NetMail code base) / Hula community
- Operating system: Linux
- Type: Groupware
- License: GNU General Public License
- Repository: none

Hula was an open source mail and calendar project based on open standards announced on February 15, 2005, by Novell.

== History ==
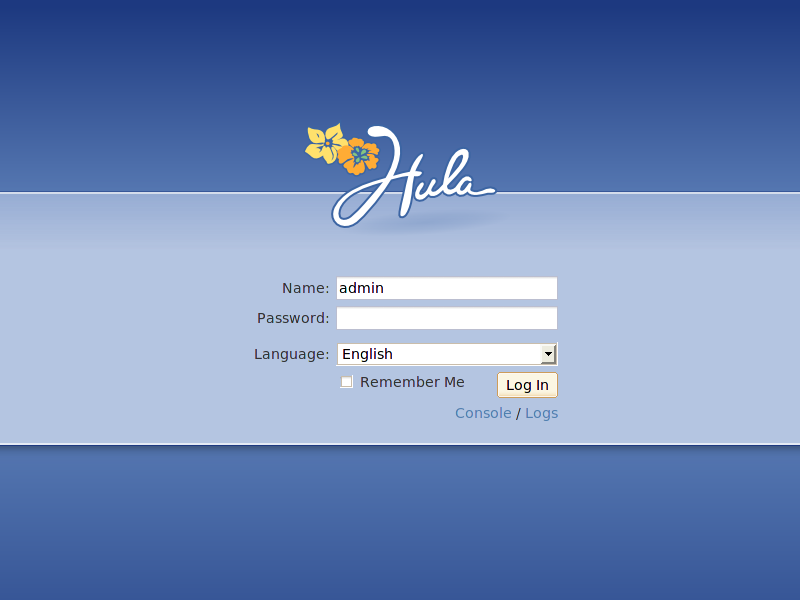
Screenshot of the Hula log-on screen

Hula was an open-source effort sponsored by Novell and developed by Dave Camp, Dalton Valliere and Joe Gasiorek, amongst others.

Hula was derived from an existing product by the same software house, called NetMail, and retained many of the architectural features of that software. However, important components such as the mail store were intended to be re-developed to integrate new functionality (such as search) and new features (such as calendaring, using the calendar server protocol CalDAV).

Hula aimed to expand in three main directions:

1. A calendaring tool
2. A web-based rich mail client
3. A search facility for all mail and calendar information within the server

It came with a web-based client to access information, but desktop applications were intended to be readily supported. Novell Evolution released with Hula support in version 2.6, and other clients were expected to support Hula closer to Hula's release.

On November 28, 2006, Novell announced that it would no longer have anyone work on it full-time. On January 31, 2007, The Messaging Architects announced an agreement to acquire NetMail and take over leadership of the open source Hula Project from Novell. The Hula project website went down in late 2007. Before it disappeared, it announced the transfer to The Messaging Architects, due to the move of Hula from Novell.

With the future of Hula unclear to many, a software fork of the source code was used to create the independent Bongo Project, and the project joined the Software Freedom Conservancy as a member project. Activity on this fork also seems to have been abandoned. Hula/Bongo should not be confused with proprietary mobile phone games Bongo Thinks, Bongo Knows, and Ask Bongo, all of which rely on in-app payments and SMS text messaging.

== See also ==
- Collaborative software
- List of personal information managers
- Ximian
