= Lemonade Profile =

Set of email protocols

The Lemonade Profile is a set of protocols and mandatory extensions which provides email access to diverse environments, including mobile handsets and other resource constrained devices. It is the product of an IETF Working Group, and is largely based on pre-existing specifications, including IMAP and the Message Submission profile of SMTP. It was first published in 2006 as RFC 4550, and updated in 2009 as RFC 5550.

== Description ==
Unlike many other mobile email proposals, including Push-IMAP, the Lemonade Profile does not provide for message submission via IMAP, but instead allows the MSA to pull message data directly from the IMAP store in a secure manner. This allows the protocols to continue to leverage the vast body of work on SMTP, and also means that any traditional IMAP client can interoperate fully with a Lemonade service.

Rather than providing a Push e-mail mechanism, The Lemonade Profile relies on the existing IMAP capability to provide short notification messages at any time, and includes support for the IDLE command. When there is ongoing activity between the server and the client, IMAP will automatically inform the client of the presence of new messages. IDLE ensures that the server will inform the client of new messages even when there is no other activity taking place between client and server by ensuring that the connection is not disrupted by a timeout. Because of this, IDLE is often cited as providing a user experience similar to that of Push e-mail.

Other Lemonade features include the ability to forward a message, part of a message or message attachment to another party—without first downloading the relevant message parts to the handset (this involves extensions to both IMAP and SMTP) as well as quick and efficient re-synchronisation of client with server in the event of a broken connection.

== Origin of the Lemonade name ==
The name derives from an off-hand comment during the formation of the working group relating to the problems of naming the profile. Lemonade does not intend to provide only for PDAs and smartphones, but to include laptops on trains and planes, e-mail access over satellite links, and other environments with constraints on bandwidth, latency, and client memory. The discussion during the formation of the group became entrenched in finding a name which encompassed all these environments, leading to a comment from the chair, "We may as well call it Pink Lemonade and have done with it."

The discussion moved on to more technical issues, but the name remained, although a backronym was formed as "License to Enhance Message Oriented Network Access for Diverse Environments".

== P-IMAP and Lemonade ==
Although a draft was produced describing Oracle's Push-IMAP, it has never been the product of an IETF working group, nor has it been considered for publication as an RFC. Instead, it is essentially a proprietary protocol that has been opened in order to provide useful input into the formation of the Lemonade Profile. Early investment by some companies, including Consilient and Oracle, have led to some confusion about its status.

At the time of writing, P-IMAP has more functionality than Lemonade's support for IMAP's IDLE command, at a cost that it is more distant from existing IMAP.
