= Consilience (disambiguation) =

Consilience is the principle that approaching the same problem by different methods should produce the same result.

Consilience may also refer to:

- Consilience (book), a 1998 book about consilience by E.O. Wilson
- Consilience (journal), a journal of sustainability science
- Consilient, a defunct Canadian technology company
