= Nokia C1-01 =

Mobile phone model

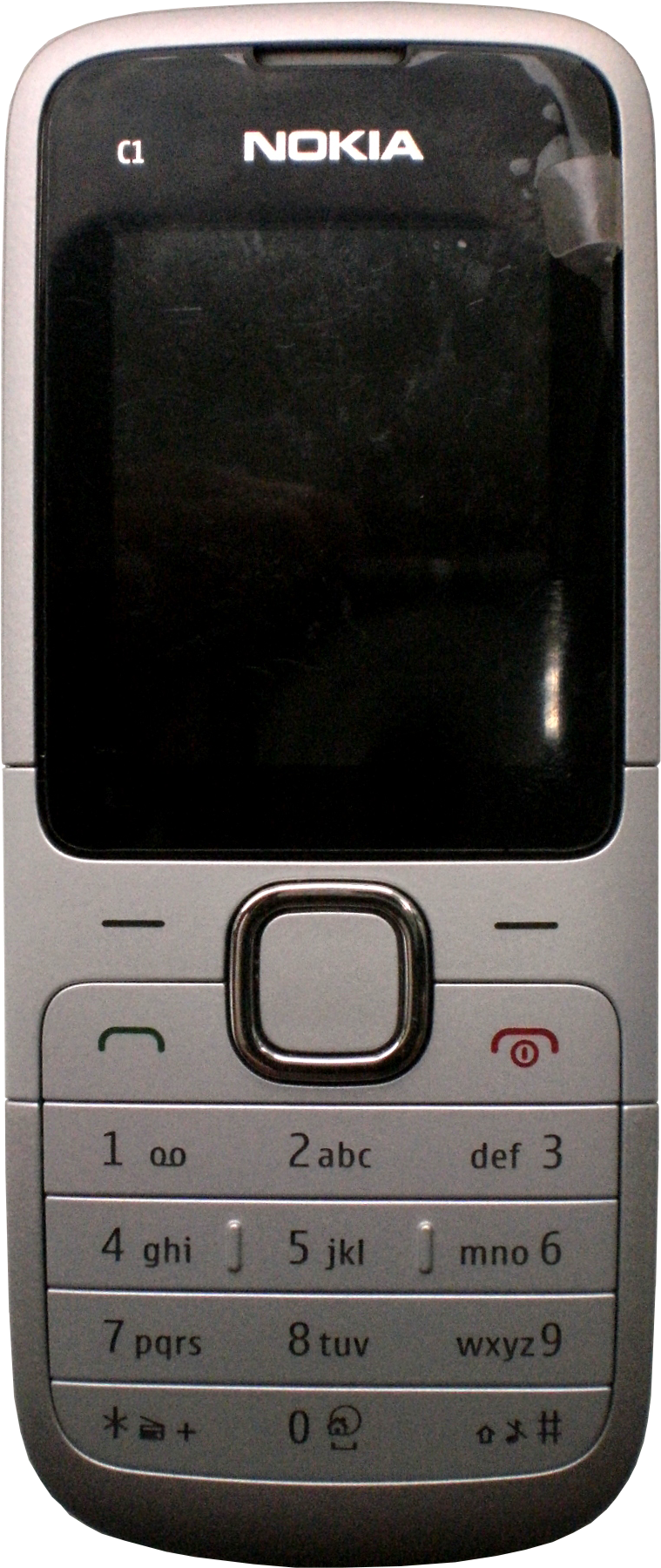
- Manufacturer: Nokia
- First released: June 2010
- Availability by region: December 2010
- Predecessor: Nokia 1680 classic Nokia 2330 classic Nokia 2600 classic Nokia 2630
- Successor: Nokia 113
- Related: Nokia 2220 (slider equivalent); Nokia C1-02; Nokia C2-00; Nokia C2-01
- Compatible networks: GSM 900/1800
- Form factor: candybar
- Dimensions: 108×45×14.65 mm (4.252×1.772×0.577 in)
- Weight: 78 g (3 oz)
- Operating system: Series 40 6th edition Lite
- Memory: 10 MB
- Battery: BL-5CB 3.7 V 1020 mAh
- Rear camera: 640 × 480 px
- Display: 128 × 160 pixels,1.8 inch TFT (65 000 colors)
- Connectivity: Bluetooth, Micro-USB

The Nokia C1-01 is a mobile telephone handset produced by Nokia. Nokia C1-01 is available in a number of languages depending on which territory it is marketed for. Models sold in South Asia support at least twelve languages: English, Hindi, Gujarati, Marathi, Punjabi, Tamil, Kannada, Telugu, Malayalam, Assamese, Bengali and Odia.

A revision of the C1-01 was released as the Nokia C1-03 with 32 MB internal memory instead of 16 MB and without EDGE support. The two are identical in appearance and all other features.

== Features ==
Nokia c1-01 was a cheap low-end phone equipped with only basic things like a camera, an MP3 player, a web browser, Bluetooth support, and a microSD card slot.

== Specification sheet ==
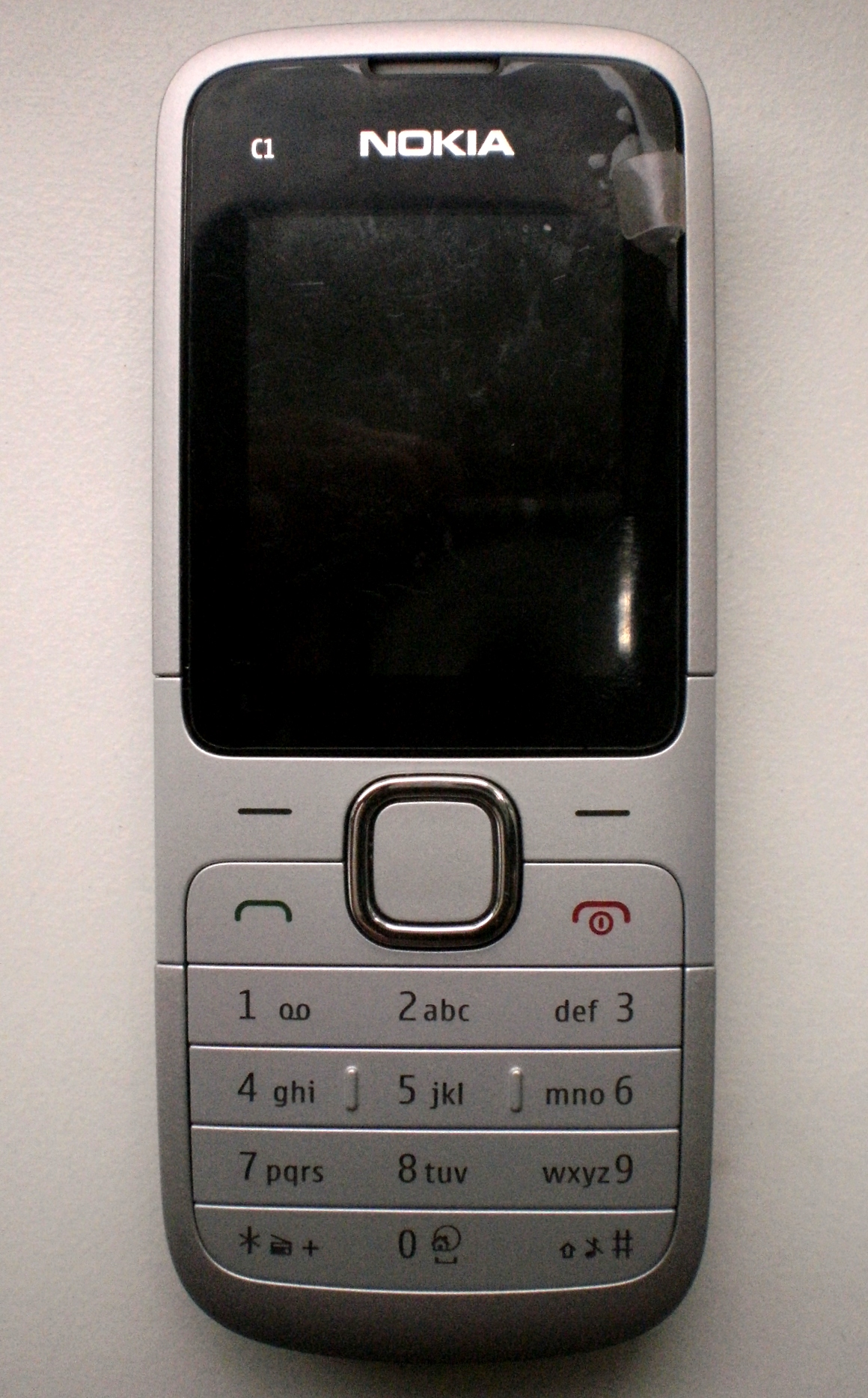
Nokia C1-01 branded to Orange UK as indicated by the web icon next to the "0" key

Nokia C1-01 with Devanagari numpad.

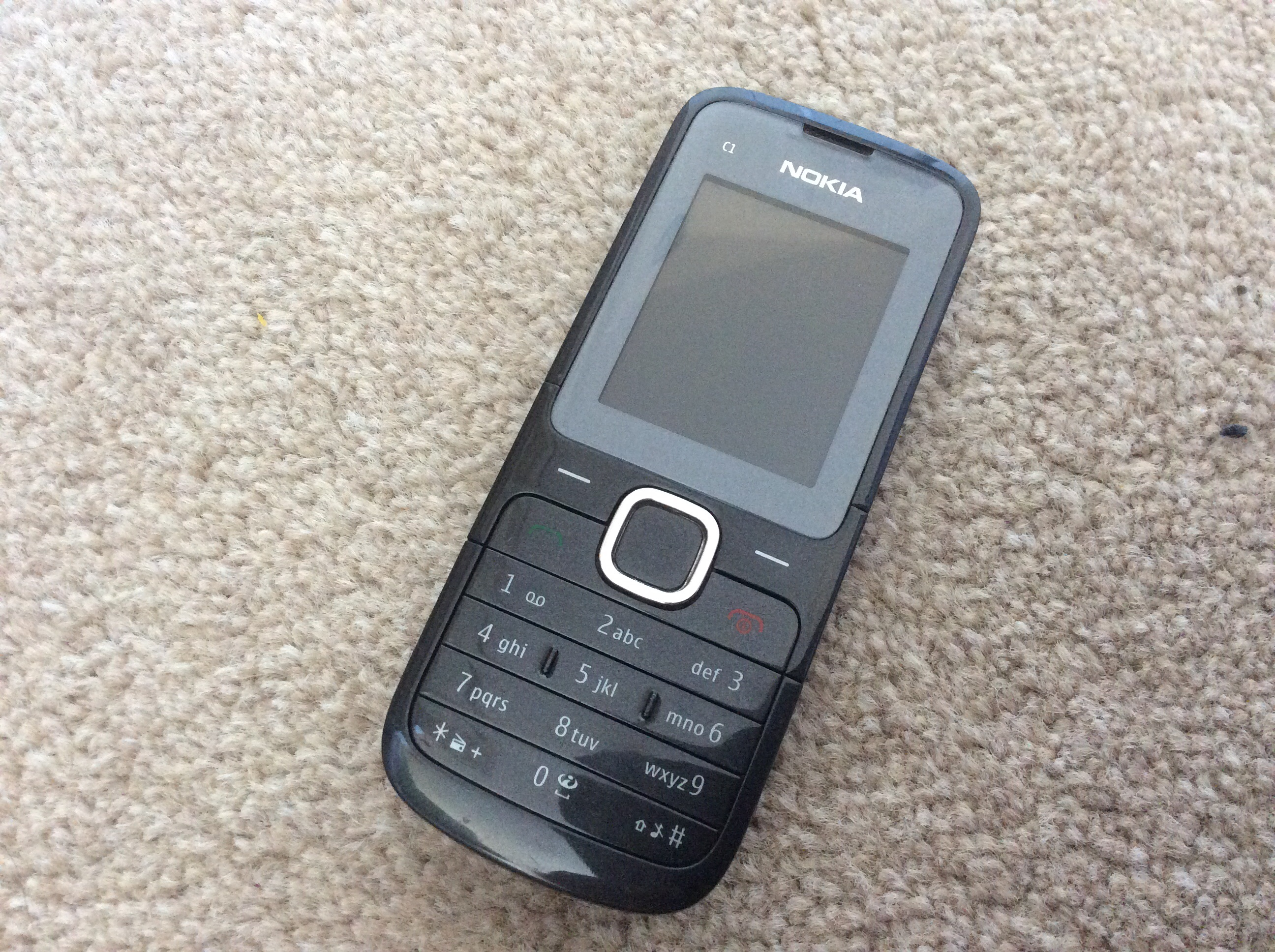
Nokia C1-01 in black color.

Type	Specification
Modes	GSM 900 / GSM 1800
Regional Availability	TBC
Weight	78.8 g
Colors	Midnight Blue, Dark Grey, Warm Grey, Red
Dimensions	108 × 45 × 14.65 mm
Form Factor	Candybar
Battery Life	Talk Time: 10.6 hours (GSM) Standby: 20 days (GSM)
Battery Type	BL-5CB 3.7 V 800 mAh
Display	Type: TFT Colors: 65 000 (18-bit) Size 1.8" Resolution: 128 × 160 pixels
Platform / OS	BB5 / Nokia Series 40, 6th Edition Lite, FOTA (Firmware update Over The Air)
Memory	10 MB
Digital TTY/TDD	Yes
Multiple Languages	Yes
Ringer Profiles	Yes
Vibrate	Yes
Bluetooth	Supported Profiles: DUN, FTP, GAP, GOEP, HFP, HSP, OPP, PAN, PBAP, SAP, SDAP, SPP
PC Sync	Yes
USB	Micro-USB, Full-Speed USB 2.0
Multiple Numbers per Name	Yes
Voice Dialing	No
Custom Graphics	Yes
Custom Ringtones	Yes
Data-Capable	Yes
Flight Mode	Yes
Packet Data	Technology: GPRS, EDGE (EGPRS)
WLAN	No
WAP / Web Browser	HTML over TCP/IP, WAP 2.0, Opera Mini, XHTML over TCP/IP
Predictive Text Entry	T9
Memory Card Slot	MicroSD, hot swappable, up to 32 GB.
Email Client	Protocols Supported: IMAP4, POP3, SMTP supports attachments
MMS	MMS 1.2 / SMIL
Text Messaging	2-Way: Yes
FM Radio	Stereo FM radio (87.5-108 MHz/76-90 MHz), RDS, Radio recording feature
Music Player	Supported Formats: AAC, AAC+, AMR-NB, AMR-WB, eAAC+, MIDI Tones (poly 64), Mobile XMF, MP3, MP4, NRT, True tones, WAV, WMA
Camera	Resolution: 640 × 480 px
Still Image support	GIF, BMP, JPG
Streaming Video	No
Video Capture	10 fps / 3GPP formats (H.263), H.264/AVC, MPEG-4, WMV
Alarm	Yes
Calculator	Yes
Calendar	Yes
SyncML	Yes
To-Do List	Yes
Voice Memo	Yes
Games	Block'd, Glamour Pinball, Sudoku, Guiter Hero, WWTBAM, FIFA 10
Headset Jack	Yes (3.5 mm)
Speaker Phone	Yes
Standard Sales Package	Nokia C1-01, Nokia Battery BL-5CB, Nokia Compact Charger AC-3, Nokia Stereo Headset WH-102, Compact user guide
Latest Firmware Version	V 06.15
