= Nokia 1680 classic =

Mobile phone from Nokia

Nokia 1680 Classic
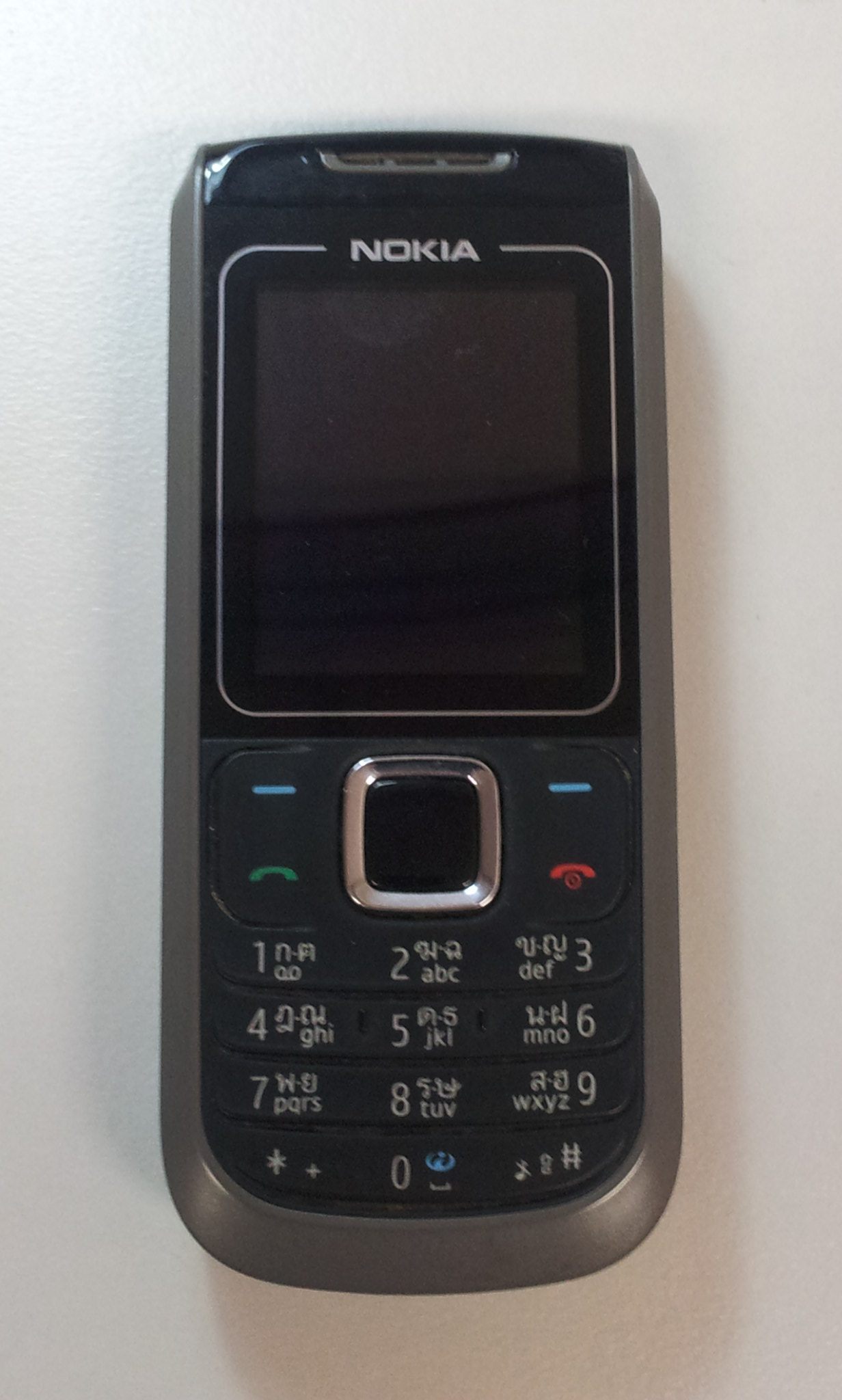
- Manufacturer: Nokia
- Series: Nokia 1000 series
- Availability by region: June 2008
- Predecessor: Nokia 1650
- Successor: Nokia C1-01
- Related: Nokia 2600 classic Nokia 2630
- Compatible networks: GSM, EGPRS
- Form factor: Candybar
- Dimensions: 108×46×15 mm (4.25×1.81×0.59 in)
- Weight: 53 g (2 oz)
- Operating system: Series 40 5th edition lite
- Memory: 11 MB
- Battery: BL-5CA, 700 mAh, Talk time: Up to 7 hrs 35 min, Stand-by: Up to 424 hrs
- Rear camera: 0.3 MP camera
- Display: 65K color, 128 x 160, TFT
- Connectivity: GSM 1800, GSM 900
- Data inputs: Numeric Keypad

The Nokia 1680 classic is an entry-level dual-band GSM mobile phone. Sharing many specifications with the Nokia 2600 classic and Nokia 2630, it has a VGA camera, speakerphone, multimedia playback, MMS messaging, web browser and email client.

== About ==
The Nokia 1680 was released in June 2008 (It was one of the T-Mobile company's best-selling phones of 2008, selling 35 million units). Its dimensions are 108 x 46 x 15 mm, and it uses a 2G Network and is activated through a mini-SIM. There is no memory card slot for more storage. However, the phone allows up to 1000 contacts to be stored in its address book, and it has 11 MB of internal storage. The phone was available to be purchased in black, slate gray, wine red, and deep plum.

== Sources ==
- "Nokia 1680 (T-Mobile). (CNET Editors' Review)".
