= Nokia 2323 classic =

Mobile phone model

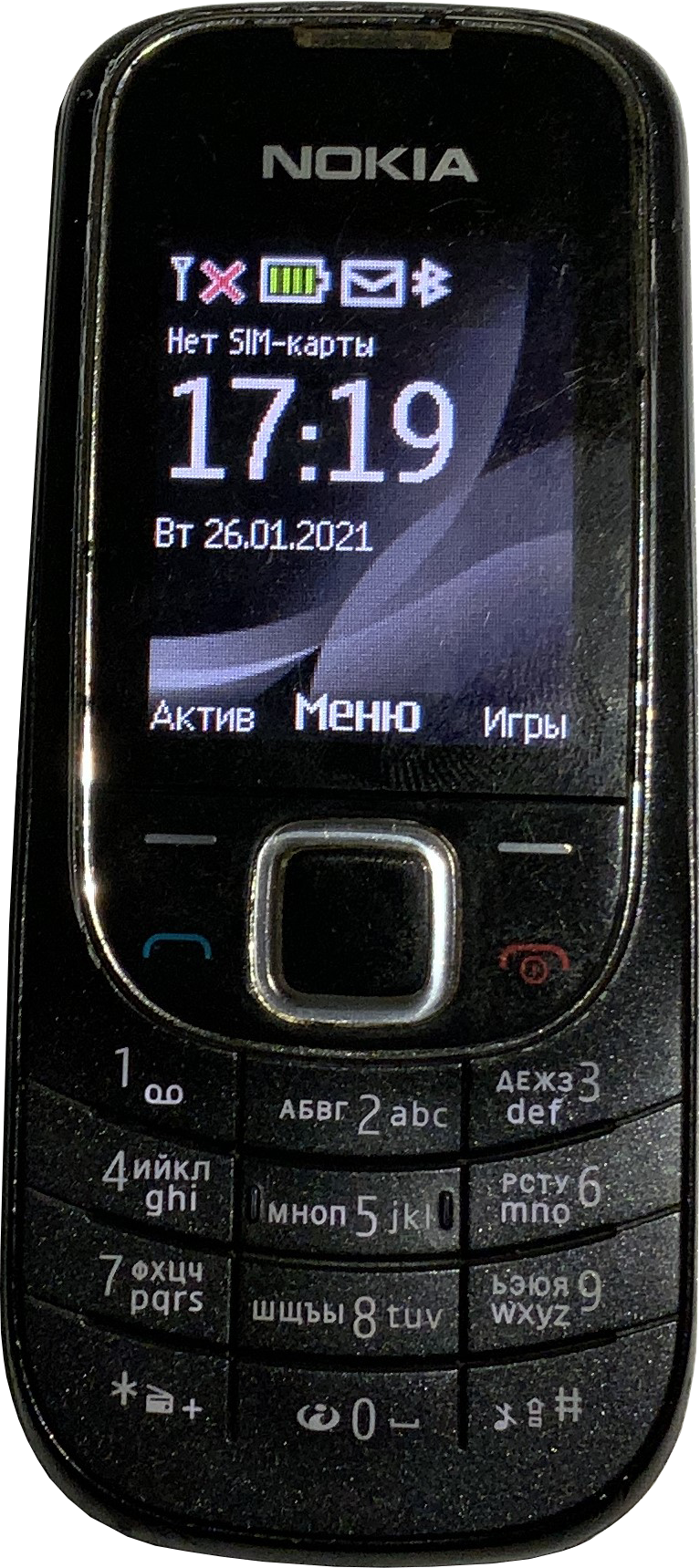
- Nokia 2323 classic in black.
- Developer: Nokia Corporation
- Manufacturer: Nokia
- Type: Basic phone
- Series: 2000 series
- Availability by region: August 2009
- Predecessor: Nokia 2310
- Successor: Nokia C1-02
- Related: Nokia 2330 classic Nokia 2730 classic Nokia C1-02; Nokia C2-01
- Compatible networks: GSM 900/1800 or 850/1900
- Form factor: Candybar
- Dimensions: 107 x 46 x 13.8 mm
- Weight: 78g
- Operating system: Series 40
- Storage: 4 MB
- SIM: miniSIM
- Battery: BL-5C 3.7V 1020mAh (removable): Standby: up to 528 h (22 days); Talk time: up to 4.50 h
- Charging: 2.0 mm Nokia Pin charging (standard)
- Rear camera: None
- Front camera: None
- Display: 65,536-colour LCD: 1.8 in (46 mm) diagonal, 128 × 160 px
- Connectivity: SMS; MMS; Email; WAP 2.0/xHTML; Bluetooth
- Other: Available in black, dark blue and dark gray.

The Nokia 2323 classic is a basic 2G feature phone announced by Nokia in November 2008 and released in August 2009. The mobile phone is aimed at emerging markets and budget-conscious consumers, and can be bought carrier-unlocked for a relatively low price.

The device runs on the Series 40 software platform, supports up to five separate address books, and is able to store personalisation data for up to five separate SIM cards. The Nokia 2323 classic is available in a number of languages depending on which territory it is marketed for. Models sold in Europe support at least thirty three languages.

== Nokia 2330 classic ==
A variant of the Nokia 2323 classic known as the Nokia 2330 classic has the same features as the 2323 classic, with the only main difference being the addition of a VGA camera.
