= Push-IMAP =

Email protocol

Push-IMAP, which is otherwise known as P-IMAP or Push extensions for Internet Message Access Protocol, is an email protocol designed as a faster way to synchronise a mobile device like a PDA or smartphone to an email server.

It was developed by Oracle and other partners, and based on IMAP with additional enhancements for optimization in a mobile setting. It was submitted as input to the Lemonade Profile IETF Working Group - but was not included in the resulting RFC 4550.

== The protocol ==
The protocol was designed to provide for a secure way to automatically keep communicating new messages between a server and a mobile device like a PDA or Smartphone. It should reduce the time and effort needed to synchronize messages between the two by using an open connection that is kept alive by some kind of heartbeat. To reduce necessary bandwidth, it uses compression and command macros. Additionally, P-IMAP features a mechanism for sending email that is derived from (but not identical to) SMTP, and so a rich email service is provided using a single connection.

P-IMAP should not be viewed as an alternative to the IMAP IDLE command (RFC 2177). In fact, IDLE is one of the required mechanisms for a P-IMAP server to notify the client (optional notifications are SMS or WAP Push).

== Other mobile technologies ==
Although they are both based on IMAP, the Yahoo! Mail and iCloud push email services for iPhone do not use a standard form of P-IMAP. Yahoo! Mail uses a special UDP message to trigger an email synchronization, while Apple's iCloud push email uses a variant of XMPP.

== See also ==
- IMAP
- Push email
- Lemonade Profile
- SyncML
