= Direct Push =

- Developer: Microsoft
- Initial release: 2006
- Operating system: Windows Mobile 5.0, 6.0, 6.1
- Platform: Mobile devices
- Type: Push e-mail
- License: Proprietary

Direct Push is Microsoft's technology for receiving e-mail instantly on Windows Mobile 5.0, 6.0 and 6.1 enabled devices, from Microsoft Exchange Servers, Kerio Connect and Zarafa. This service was launched primarily for business users and was supported around 2006 by about 100 operators.

It provides response times similar to the push technology of RIM's BlackBerry service, but needs no special server upgrades other than having Exchange Server 2003 Service Pack 2. It works by initiating an HTTPS connection to the server through any connectivity that can carry an IP traffic such as GPRS or EDGE technologies, through the firewall, then a front-end server that connects to the Exchange server that hosts the user mailbox. It also eliminates the need for devices to have a dedicated IP address, but requires "Always on" GPRS or 3G connection. The Direct Push technology served as a feature for the Exchange Server ActiveSync service, which allowed Windows Mobile 5.0 and later versions of Windows Mobile software to keep their data up-to-date.
