= Nokia 2600 classic =

2008 cell phone model

Nokia 2600 Classic
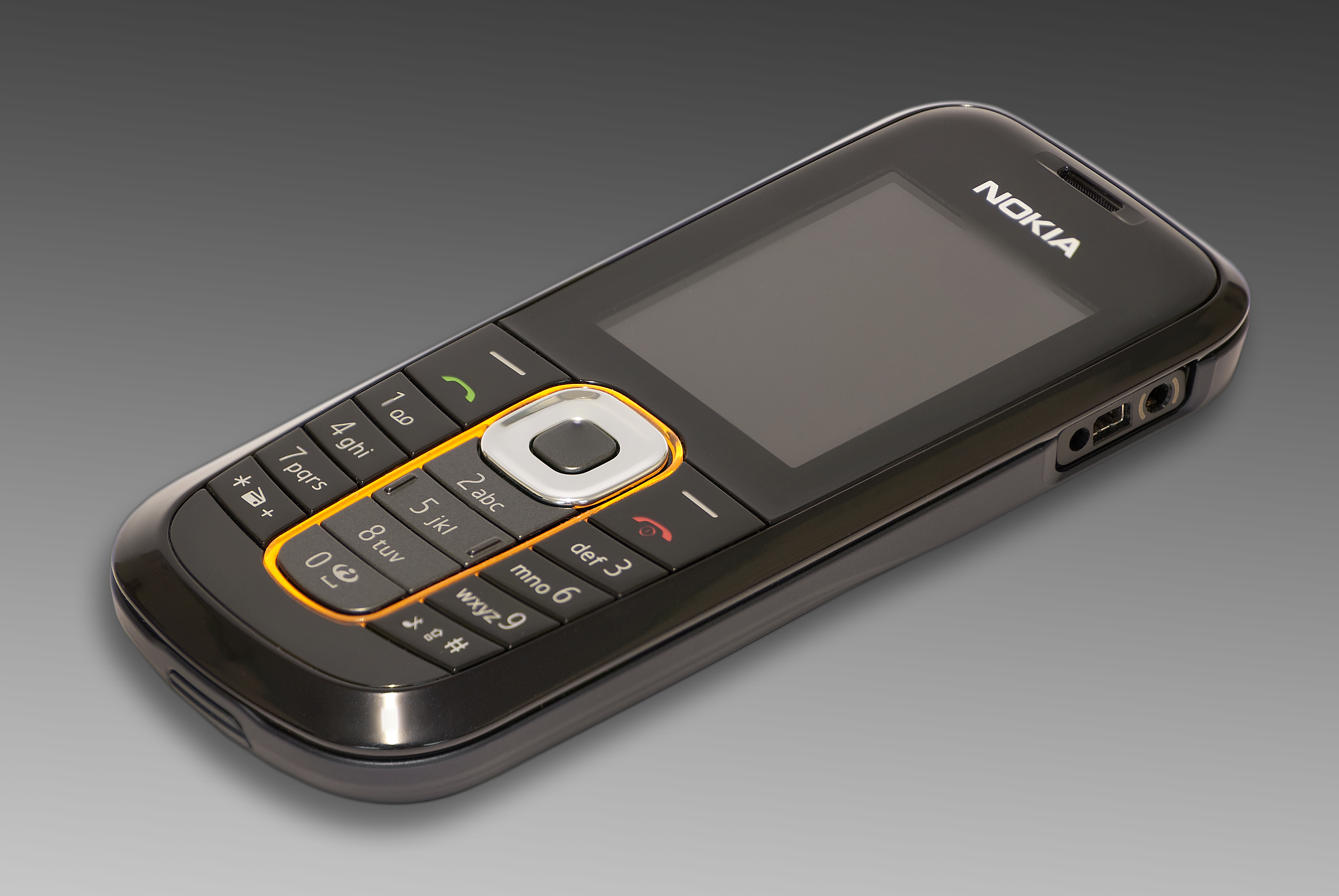
- Manufacturer: Nokia
- First released: February 2008
- Availability by region: March 2008
- Predecessor: Nokia 2610
- Successor: Nokia 2690; Nokia C1-01; Nokia C2-00
- Related: Nokia 3600 slide Nokia 3120 classic Nokia 2680 slide Nokia 2630; Nokia 1680 classic
- Form factor: standard
- Dimensions: 109.6×46.7×12 mm (4.31×1.84×0.47 in)
- Weight: 73.2 g (3 oz) (with battery)
- Memory: 10 MB
- Battery: BL-5BT, 870 mAh, Talk time: Up to 6 hrs, Stand-by: Up to 24 days
- Rear camera: VGA 0.3-megapixel camera
- Display: 65K color, 128 x 160, TFT
- Connectivity: Photo and data sharing with Bluetooth 2.0

The Nokia 2600 classic is a Nokia Dual-band GSM phone E900/1800 or E850/1900 (for AT&T) that includes a VGA camera, FM radio, Bluetooth, E-mail and mobile Internet access via a WAP browser. Announced on 22 January 2008. Additionally, the Nokia 2600 classic supports MMS and Nokia Xpress Audio Messaging, for recording and editing messages on the go. It also had a similar sliding variant called Nokia 2680 slide.

== Technical specifications ==
=== Key features ===
- MP3, MIDI ringtones and user-created ringtones (Voice Recorder)
- FM radio
- Pre-paid Tracker
- Bluetooth 2.0
- SMS, MMS, email, and Nokia Xpress Audio Messaging
- 1000-entry phone book
- Supports 2G Cellular Data feature (class 6, downlink only)

=== Operating frequency ===
- RM-341: Dual band GSM 850/1900 MHz(AT&T American Version)
- RM-340: Dual band EGSM 900/1800 MHz(EU/Asia version)

=== Dimensions ===
- Volume: 63.5 cc
- Weight: 73.2 g (with battery)
- Length: 109.6 mm
- Width: 46.7 mm
- Thickness: 12 mm

=== Display ===
- 65K color, 128x160 pixels

=== Imaging ===
- VGA camera
- TFT color display
- MMS

=== Multimedia ===
- Digital VGA camera with video recorder for pictures and video
- FM radio

=== Messaging ===
- Email supports POP3, IMP4 and SMTP protocols
- Nokia Xpress Audio Messaging (sends greetings with short voice clips)
- SMS text messages
- MMS messaging with pictures
- Personalize SMS message alerts with your favorite ringtones

=== Java applications ===
- xHTML over TCP/IP, WAP 2.0
- MMS 1.2 (supports 300KB size)
- Nokia Xpress Audio Messaging
- Java MIDP 2.0 applications
- OMA DRM 1.0 smart content download (forward lock)

=== Connectivity ===
- Photo and data sharing with Bluetooth 2.0

=== Browsing ===
- WAP 2.0 web browser (Xhtml) (This feature is network dependent)

=== Personal information management (PIM) ===
- Powerful organizer with week and month review, and localized calendar
- Advanced calculator
- Converter II (metric/inches, temperature etc.)
- 10 digit calculator with square root support, scientific and loan calculation features
- English-Chinese dictionary (APAC & China - selected variants only)
- Analog/digital clock
- Expense manager

=== Power management ===
- Operation times vary depending on the network, SIM card and usage
- Battery: BL-5BT
- Capacity: 870 mAh
- Talk time: Up to 6 hrs
- Stand-by: Up to 24 days

=== Sales package contents ===
- Nokia 2600 classic
- Nokia battery BL-5BT
- Nokia standard charger AC-3, new AC-6C for China variant, CA-100c
- Nokia HS-47 Stereo Headset
- Extra Xpress-On Cover

=== Operating system ===
- Series 40 5th Edition LE

=== Operating frequency ===
- RM-340: Dual band EGSM 900/1800 MHz(EU/Asia version)
- RM-341: Dual band GSM 850/1900 MHz(AT&T American version)

=== Memory ===
- Max User Storage: 13.7mb
- Maximum Heap Size: 1 mb

=== Extra features ===
- Handsfree Speaker
- Themes

=== Regional availability ===
- Africa
- Asia-Pacific
- China
- Europe
- Middle East
- North America (AT&T)

=== Sales package contents (Europe) ===
- Nokia 2600 classic
- Nokia Stereo Headset WH-101
- Nokia Compact Charger AC-3
- Nokia Battery BL-5BT
- Xpress-on colour cover (Midnight Blue with Sunset Orange or Sandy Gold with Sky Blue)
- User guide

=== Sales package contents (Asia) ===
- Nokia 2600 classic
- Nokia battery BL-5BT
- Nokia standard charger AC-3
- Nokia HS-47 Stereo Headset
- Extra Xpress-On Cover

== Sources ==
- Nokia Europe
- Nokia Bangladesh
- Forum Nokia
