= Consilient =

Software company in Canada

- Type: Privately held company
- Industry: software
- Headquarters: Labrador, Canada
- Area served: San Francisco; Singapore
- Products: Consilient Push
- Services: push email software

Consilient was a privately held company located in St. John's, Newfoundland and Labrador, Canada. Other offices were located in San Francisco and Singapore. The company provided push email software for mobile phones and devices using open standards.

As of Monday, November 17, 2008, Consilient shut its doors and laid off all of its employees without pay and without warning. This was due to a move by a major investor, Quorum Group of Companies , to take over the firm. Quorum Group has revealed no plans for the future of the company and several weeks later the company's future was still uncertain.

On May 30, 2009, the ACOA (Atlantic Canada Opportunities Agency, a Federal government incubation fund for private companies) announced its intention to sue Consilient for $7.7 million Canadian, the principal that had been invested in Consilient over the years.

== Products ==
Consilient offered a free Push email application called Consilient Push for mobile phones that supported up to 5 email accounts. POP3 and IMAP4 email accounts were supported as well as Yahoo, Gmail, AOL and Hotmail. The application had photo attaching and sending capability and also supported attachments in MS Word and PDF. Consilient also offered a mobile advertising server solution, allowing telecom companies to easily integrate mobile advertising into their consumer products.
