= Nokia C1-02 =

Mobile phone model

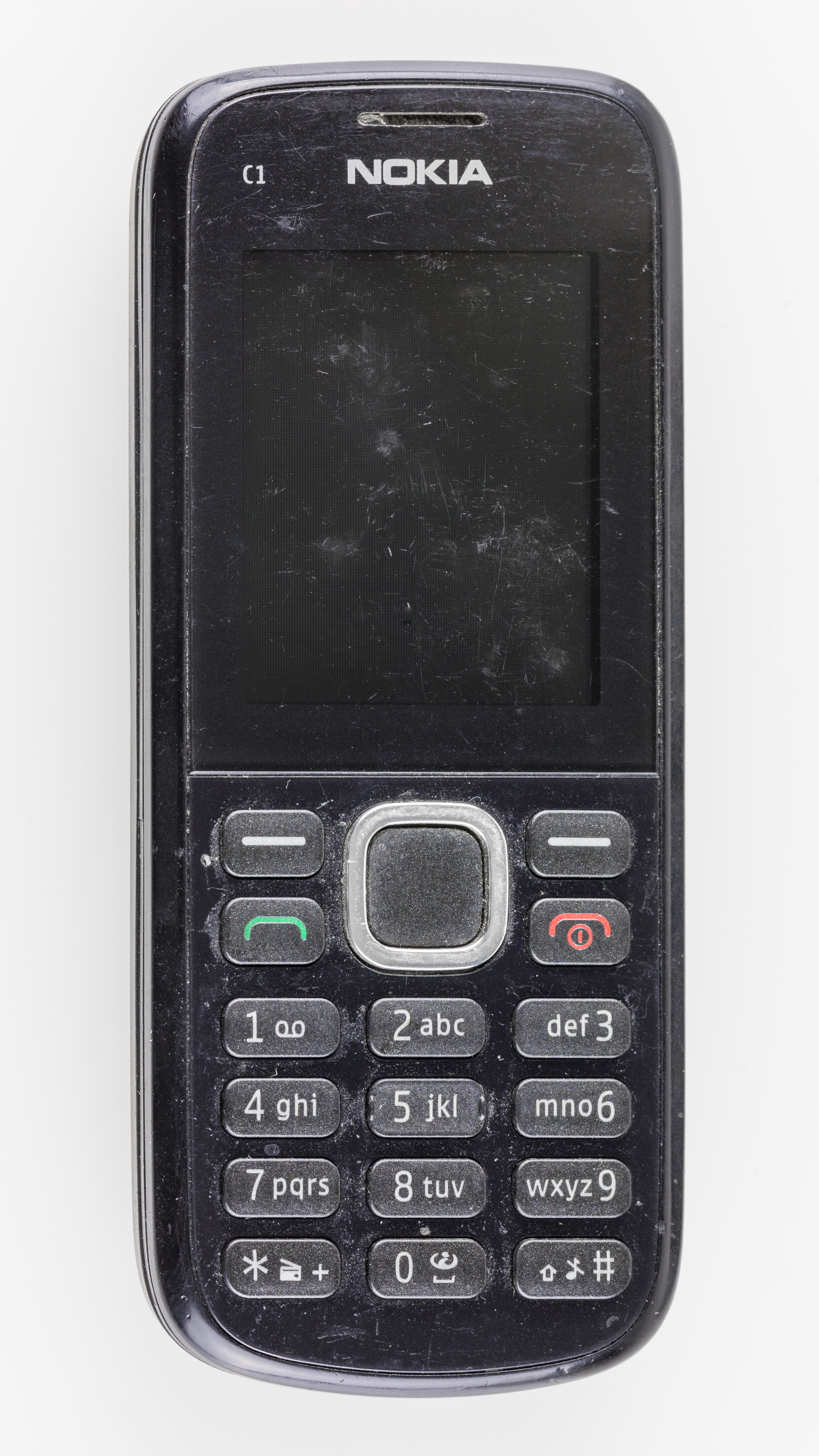
- Manufacturer: Nokia
- First released: June 2010
- Availability by region: January 2011
- Successor: Nokia 109
- Related: Nokia C1-01
- Compatible networks: GSM 900/1800 MHz
- Form factor: bar
- Dimensions: 108×45×13.8 mm (4.25×1.77×0.54 in)
- Weight: 77.5 g (2.72 oz)
- Operating system: Series 40
- Memory: 64 MB ROM, 16 MB RAM
- Storage: 10 MB
- Removable storage: microSD/TransFlash expandable up to 32 GB
- Battery: BL-5C 1200mAH, BL-5CB 800 mAH, Standby 504hr, Talktime 10hr 40min
- Rear camera: No
- Display: 1.8 inches, 128x160 px, TFT, 65k colors
- Connectivity: Bluetooth 2.1
- Development status: Discontinued

Nokia C1-02 is a basic phone running on Nokia OS Series 40, announced in June 2010 and released in January 2011. It supports two battery types, Nokia BL-5C and BL-5CB. It has an internal memory of 10 MB and RAM of 16 MB. The expandable memory of the device is up to 32 GB. It is available in four colours namely - Black, Dark Plum, Blue and Cool Grey. Its cost in July 2015 was around Rs. 2169 in India. Outside India it was sold at $19.99 approx (cost in August 2016).

== Features ==
The Nokia C1-02 has a 1.8-inch TFT screen with a resolution of 128 × 160 pixels, which supports around 65,000 colors. It has Bluetooth v2.1 with A2DP enabled. It is a good music phone and supports MP3, WAV, WMA, AAC+ formats. The device is Java (J2ME) enabled with MIDP 2.1 version. It supports predictive text input and has a voice memo. It can be connected to the Internet via GPRS and supports WAP, HTML, XHTML, WML, and CSS. It can also be connected to a PC via PC Suite or Mass Storage.

== Software ==
The device has support for Ovi Mail, Ovi Chat, Ovi Life Tools, Nokia messaging service, FM Radio, Opera mini, CEC Dictionary, Advanced Calculator, good improved and organised Gallery and Organizer. It also can save 1000 contacts and can do photocalls. It has pre-installed themes, but lacks 3G, GPS, Wi-Fi and a camera.

== Inside The Box ==
- A mobile unit
- Battery
- Headset
- Nokia charger
- User manual
- Nokia leaflets
- USB cable
