= IMAP IDLE =

Internet mail protocol

In email technology, IDLE is an IMAP feature described in RFC 2177 that allows a client to indicate to the server that it is ready to accept notifications in real time.

== Significance ==
The IDLE feature allows IMAP email users to immediately receive any mailbox changes without having to undertake any action such as clicking on a refresh button, or having the email client automatically and repeatedly ask the server for new messages.

== Usage ==
IMAP4 servers that support IDLE will include the string "IDLE" in the result of their CAPABILITY command. This allows email users to receive near instant notification of a new email.

== See also ==
- Push-IMAP
