= Pine (email client) =

Email and newsgroups client

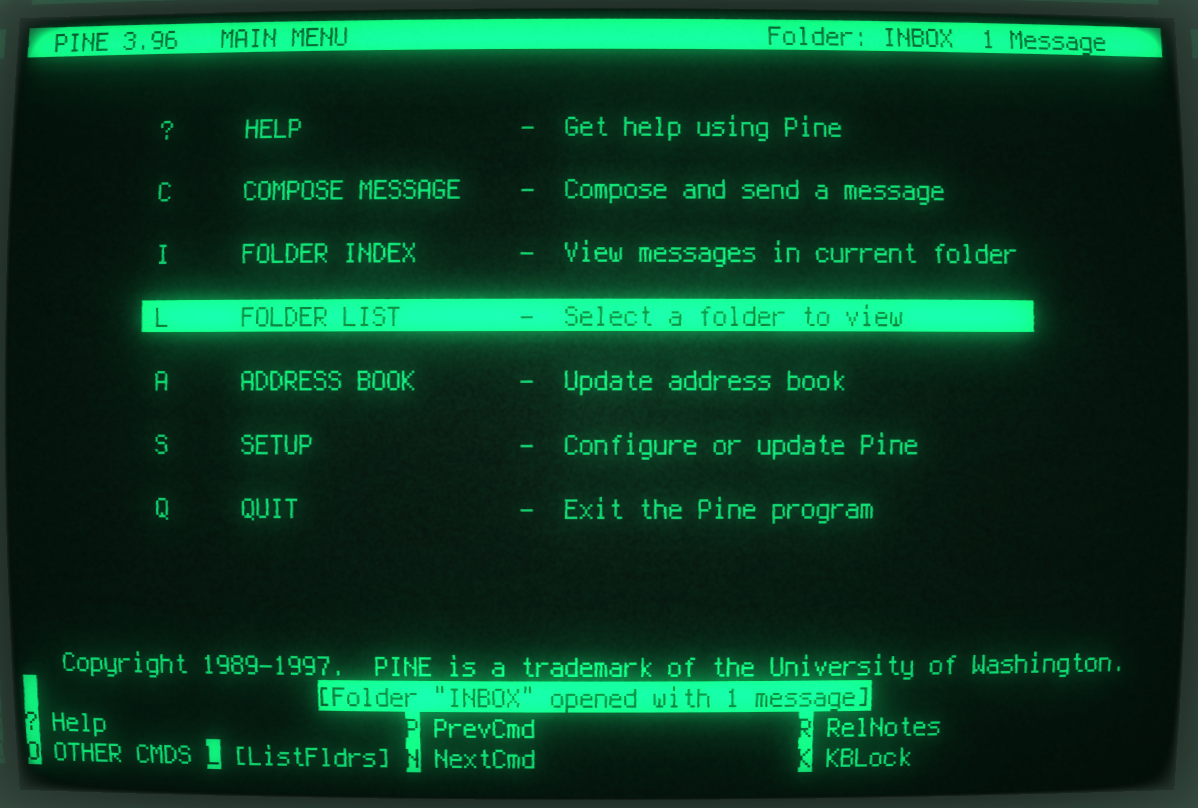
- Developer: University of Washington
- Release: March 24, 1992; 34 years ago
- Final release: 4.64 / 28 September 2005
- Operating system: Windows, Unix, Linux
- Successor: Alpine
- Type: Email client
- License: Freeware
- Website: www.washington.edu/pine/ at the Wayback Machine (archived 28 March 2019)

Pine is a freeware, text-based email client which was developed at the University of Washington. The first version was written in 1989, and announced to the public in March 1992. Source code was available for only the Unix version under a license written by the University of Washington. Pine is no longer under development, and has been replaced by the Alpine client, which is available under the Apache License.

== Supported platforms ==
There are Unix, Windows, and Linux versions of Pine. The Unix/Linux version is text user interface based—its message editor inspired the text editor Pico. The Windows (and formerly DOS) version is called PC-Pine. WebPine was available to individuals associated with the University of Washington (students, faculty, etc.)—a version of Pine implemented as a web application.

== Etymology ==
Many people believe that Pine stands for "Pine Is Not Elm". One of its original authors, Laurence Lundblade, insists this was never the case and that it started off simply as a word and not an acronym, and that his first choice of a backronym for pine would be "Pine Is Nearly Elm". Over time, it was changed by the university to mean Program for Internet News and E-mail. The original announcement said: "Pine was originally based on Elm, but it has evolved much since, ('Pine Is No-longer Elm')."

== Licensing and clones ==
Up to version 3.91, the Pine license was similar to BSD, and it stated that

Permission to use, copy, modify, and distribute this software and its documentation for any purpose and without fee to the University of Washington is hereby granted …

The university registered a trademark for the Pine name with respect to "computer programs used in communication and electronic mail applications" in March 1995.

From version 3.92, the holder of the copyright, the University of Washington, changed the license so that even if the source code was still available, they did not allow modifications and changes to Pine to be distributed by anyone other than themselves. They also claimed that even the old license never allowed distribution of modified versions.

The trademark for the Pine name was part of their position in this matter.

In reaction, some developers forked version 3.91 under the name MANA (for Mail And News Agent) to avoid the trademark issue and the GNU Project adopted it as GNU Mana. Richard Stallman claims that the University of Washington threatened to sue the Free Software Foundation for distributing the modified Pine program, resulting in the development of MANA ceasing and no versions being released.

The Pico clone GNU nano was also written due to the change in licensing terms of Pine and Pico, as explained by nano's author in a blog post criticizing the license in 2001.

The University of Washington later modified their license somewhat to allow unmodified distribution of Pine alongside collections of free software, but the license still does not conform to the Open Source and the Free Software Guidelines so it is source-available software.

== Alpine ==
In 2006, the University of Washington announced that it stopped development of Pine with Pine 4.64, although Pine continues to be supported.

In its place is a new family of email tools based upon Pine, called Alpine and licensed under the Apache License, version 2. November 29, 2006 saw the first public alpha release, which forms a new approach, since the alpha test of Pine was always non-public.

Alpine 1.0 was publicly released on December 20, 2007. The most recent version 2.26 was released on June 3, 2022.

== See also ==
- Alpine (email client)
- Comparison of email clients
- Mark Crispin
- Text-based email client
- UW IMAP
