= Email management =

Field of communications management

Email management is a specific field of communications management for managing high volumes of inbound electronic mail received by organizations. Email management is an essential component of customer service management. Customer service call centers employ email response management agents along with telephone support agents, and typically use software solutions to manage emails.

== Background ==
Email management evolved from database management and customer relationship management (CRM). Database management began in the 1960s. IBM provided one of the earliest solutions and established standards for database management. Prominent database management platforms include Oracle, SQL Server etc. Vern Watts, inventor of IBM's Information Management System (IMS), and Larry Ellison, founder of Oracle Corporation, are pioneers in database management systems.

As database management solutions became more sophisticated in functionality, marketing and customer service departments of large organizations started using information about customers for database marketing. Customer service managers soon realized that they could extend database marketing to store and retrieve all customer communications to improve visibility with key clients. This led to the development of CRM systems which managed communication with customers and prospective customers using various media, including phone, direct mail, web site, and email. Pioneers in CRM include David Duffield, creator of PeopleSoft, and Tom Siebel, founder of Siebel Systems.

As email became one of the most prevalent business-to-customer communication media in the 1990s, customer service departments needed specialized systems of tools and trained staff to manage email communication with their customers and prospective customers.

== History ==
In 1994, Information Cybernetics, a company in Cambridge, Massachusetts, developed tools for pattern analysis and categorization of emails and other electronic communication channels. The platform of tools was called EchoMail. The first company to adopt EchoMail was AT&T. JC Penney adopted EchoMail in 1997.

Another early company that developed email management software systems was FortÈ Internet Software, which produced Adante. By late 1999, companies such as KANA Software, Inc., also emerged to support this effort. Eventually, companies such as Siebel CRM Systems, Inc., incorporated components of email management into their CRM systems.

== Typical system components ==
An email management system consists of various components to handle different phases of the email management process. These components include:

- Email ticketing system – One of the key tasks performed by email management systems is to allocate reference numbers to all incoming emails. This process is known as ticketing. All subsequent emails relating to one matter can then be grouped under the same reference. This allows users to track their correspondence in a more time effective and productive way.
- Email receipt module – Receives emails, filters out spam and unwanted content to a separate queue (sometimes called email filtering), and assigns unique ticket numbers based on certain conditions.
- Bayesian spam filters – Statistical technique of filtering spam that most current email management systems utilize.
- Data enhancement module – Adds tags to each email for further processing and may include the ability to connect to remote databases and retrieve specific information about the email author and his/her transactions with the organization.
- Intelligent Analysis module – Reads the subject, message, and attachments, and any tags added by the data enhancement module, analyzing its content in an attempt to understand the subject matter of the email. This module may store this 'intelligence' as additional tags.

In addition to system components, effective email management involves monitoring engagement and optimizing responses. Statistics show that businesses that track email interactions and implement targeted outreach strategies can achieve higher engagement rates and improved customer satisfaction.
