= Push email =

Email system

Push email is an email system that provides an always-on capability, in which when new email arrives at the mail delivery agent (MDA) (commonly called mail server), it is immediately, actively transferred (pushed) by the MDA to the mail user agent (MUA), also called the email client, so that the end-user can see incoming email immediately. This is in contrast with systems that check for new incoming mail every so often, on a schedule. Email clients include smartphones and, less strictly, IMAP personal computer mail applications.

== Comparison with polling email ==
Outgoing mail is generally pushed from the sender to the final mail delivery agent (and possibly via intermediate mail servers) using Simple Mail Transfer Protocol. If the receiver uses a polling email delivery protocol, the final step from the last mail delivery agent to the client is done using a poll. Post Office Protocol (POP3) is an example of a polling email delivery protocol. At login and later at intervals, the mail user agent (client) polls the mail delivery agent (server) to see if there is new mail, and if so downloads it to a mailbox on the user's computer. Extending the "push" to the last delivery step is what distinguishes push email from polling email systems.

The reason that polling is often used for the last stage of mail delivery is that, although the server mail delivery agent would normally be permanently connected to the network, it does not necessarily know how to locate the client mail user agent, which may only be connected occasionally and also change network address quite often. For example, a user with a laptop on a Wi-Fi connection may be assigned different addresses from the network DHCP server periodically and have no persistent network name. When new mail arrives to the mail server, it does not know what address the client is currently assigned.

The Internet Message Access Protocol (IMAP) provides support for polling and notifications. When a client receives a notification from a server, the client may choose to fetch the new data from the server. This makes retrieval of new messages more flexible than a purely push system, because the client can choose whether to download new message data.

== Mobile users ==
Although push email had existed in wired-based systems for many years, one of the first uses of the system with a portable, "always on" wireless device outside Asia was the BlackBerry service from Research In Motion. In Japan, "push email" has been standard in cell phones since 2000.

=== iOS ===
Apple's iPhone, iPad and iPod Touch support Hotmail push email. Until early 2013, they supported Gmail push email (via Google Sync) and Microsoft's Exchange ActiveSync platform, allowing them to synchronize email, calendars and contacts with mail servers. Apple's iCloud service offers support for push email, contacts, and calendars, although as of the 24 February 2012, this has been temporarily disabled in Germany due to lawsuits. However, by setting up a new account using IMAP IDLE, push email is restored.

=== Android ===
Android's built-in Gmail client uses Google Cloud Messaging to push email for Gmail accounts set up to sync with the phone. Android also supports Microsoft Exchange accounts natively through its default mail application. When "Push" is configured, emails arriving into the Microsoft Exchange inbox are instantly pushed to the device. Calendar events sync both ways between Exchange and the device.

Yahoo Mail may be pushed to an Android device, as Android now supports IMAP4 (as of September 2015). An alternative for Yahoo Mail is to install the free Yahoo Mail app, which provides instant push email. Numerous Yahoo users have complained that push does not function reliably; Yahoo has attributed this to server issues rather than the Smartphone app.

In 2010 Hotmail, and its replacement, Outlook.com, have been made push configurable for Android smartphones through the default mail application.

=== Windows Mobile and Windows Phone ===
Microsoft began offering real-time email notification with Windows Mobile 2003 (sending SMS messages when new mail arrived), then replaced it with a simulated push experience (long polling) in 2007 with the release of Windows Mobile 5 AKU2 under the name "Direct Push Technology". 'Direct Push' technology is an additional feature added to Microsoft Exchange 2003 with service pack 2 that adds messaging and security features. A phone device running Windows Mobile 5 is enabled to poll the Exchange Server every 30 minutes. If new mail arrives in the polling interval, it is instantly pulled, using a subscriber's existing wireless phone account. This allows the device to have a changing IP or to traverse NAT/Proxy.

=== Nokia Symbian Series 60 ===
Some Nokia Symbian S60 models support basic IMAP IDLE functionality with its built-in client. But on newer E72, E52 etc. phones this functionality is broken, because connection to the mail server is closed (probably even outside the mailing application) and never restored.

==== Nokia Mail for Exchange ====
The Nokia asha smartphones and select models of Nseries smartphones and newer s60 and Symbian^3 handsets running symbian os 9.x or Symbian^3 support the Mail for Exchange software, which is compatible with Microsoft Exchange Server Active Sync and Direct Push, allowing the Nokia smartphones to receive push email as well as sync contact lists, calendars, and tasks with Exchange servers. Global Address Lookup is also supported, starting with version 2 of the Mail for Exchange software.

==== Nokia Messaging ====
Nokia Messaging Email is a push email service and client application that supports most of the popular email providers like Windows Live Hotmail, Yahoo! Mail, Gmail and many more. Nokia Messaging servers aggregate messages from up to ten accounts on and pushes them to compliant devices (Nokia S60 and some S40, plus Maemo-based devices like the N900). As of August 2012 Nokia Messaging Email is in the process of being phased out.

=== Palm OS ===
Palm Smartphone devices have had IMAP IDLE available through the use of 3rd Party software ChatterEmail as early as 2004. There is no additional server software required.

=== Palm webOS ===
The Palm Pre webOS has push email for Gmail, IMAP, and Exchange accounts.

=== BlackBerry ===
BlackBerry uses wireless mail user agent devices and a BlackBerry Enterprise Server (BES) attached to a traditional email system. The BES monitors the email server, and when it sees new email for a BlackBerry user, it retrieves (pulls) a copy and then pushes it to the BlackBerry handheld device over the wireless network.

BlackBerry became very popular, in part because it offers remote users "instant" email; new emails appear on the device as soon as they arrive, without the need for any user intervention. The handheld becomes a mobile, dynamically updating, copy of the user's mailbox. As a result of the success of BlackBerry, other manufacturers have developed push email systems for other handheld devices, such as Symbian- and Windows Mobile-based mobile phones. However, they only support push email for some email services.

With the release of the BlackBerry 10 operating system for its new generation of mobile device, BES is no longer available for non-corporate client email delivery. Instead, BlackBerry 10 offers POP, IMAP, or ActiveSync for transferring email to and from a device. Of these, the latter two can provide push email delivery if the server supports it. Data compression is also not provided anymore.

=== Sony Ericsson ===
Sony Ericsson Smartphones (M600, P990, W950, P1, W960, W995, G900, G700) as well as some Cybershot phones (K790, K800, K810, K850, C510, C905, J105i) feature push email using IMAP IDLE or with the built-in ActiveSync client (developed by Dataviz). Most other Sony Ericsson phones support IMAP IDLE push email quite well (only the inbox however).

=== Other mobile solutions ===
Most non-proprietary solutions are network independent, meaning that as long as a device is data-enabled and has an email client, it will have the ability to send/receive emails in any country and via any telephone company that has data service on its network. It also means that as long as the device is not SIM locked (in the case of GSM systems), the constraints of BlackBerry, such as network locking, vendor locking (BlackBerry devices and BlackBerry Connect devices) and data-roaming charges (for non-home access) are not an issue. For a GSM system, install a SIM card appropriate for the location, have the correct APN settings and one's mail will be delivered at local rates.

== Simulation using traditional email ==
Traditional mobile mail clients may poll for new mail at frequent intervals, with or without downloading the mail to the client, thus providing a similar user experience as push email.

IMAP allows many notifications to be sent at any time, but not message data. The IDLE command is often used to signal the ability of a client to process notifications sent outside of a running command, which effectively provides a user experience identical to push.

== Protocols ==
In contrast to traditional email, most of the protocols used in popular current systems are proprietary. For example, BlackBerry uses its own private protocols. Both the Push-IMAP standard and parts of the SyncML standards are attempting to develop more open solutions.

IETF Lemonade is a set of extensions to IMAP and SMTP to make them more suited to the demands of mobile email. Among the extensions are rapid IMAP resynchronization and a new NOTIFY command in IMAP.

== See also ==
- History of email
