= WinnowTag =

winnowTag is a web-based recommender system and news aggregator in which a person tags example items as belonging to a topic, thus training statistical text classification software to find more items on that same topic. Released as a publicly available web application in September 2010 by Mindloom, winnowTag uses Winnow content recommendation, a Naive Bayes text classifier evolved from SpamBayes.

Users of winnowTag create and share tags, and use the shared tags of others to find on-topic content in real time. Users can add feeds, import OPML feed lists, and publish feeds of items found by tags. winnowTag collects and retains items from the last three months of thousands of blog, news, and website Atom and RSS feeds.

== Comparison ==
With many news aggregators users find and add each feed they wish to read, and scan the titles of all items published in those feeds to find content they want. Thus it is possible to consider every item published in a set of feeds, but the volume of items to view grows as the set of feeds grows.

In winnowTag, each tag filters all items in all feeds added by all users to automatically find information on its topic. Thus it is possible to discover on-topic items from a larger set of feeds than could be manually reviewed, but not all the on-topic items are found, and there is no facility for seeing every item published in a set of feeds.

== Background ==
The winnowTag project, funded by The Kaphan Foundation, develops computer technology to help online communities self-organize and cope with large volumes of unstructured information. A principal idea is that users need individually tailored views (tags) reflecting their own specific interests. The tags in turn represent common interests that can be shared between users.

An early premise was derived from ecology. Instead of static, unchanging software, users get fragments of software that can be copied and aligned into different forms, and from these pieces they construct their own unique software that does what they want. Then they pass pieces of software around, and over time this population of fragments of software acts like an evolving ecology and adapts to demands of users.
