= Tim Peters (software engineer) =

American software developer

- Born: March 26, 1952; Milwaukee, Wisconsin, U.S.
- Died: c. July 15, 2026 (aged 74); Ashland, Wisconsin, U.S.
- Occupation: Software developer
- Awards: PSF Distinguished Service Award

Tim Peters was a software developer who is known for creating the Timsort hybrid sorting algorithm and for his major contributions to the Python programming language and its original CPython implementation. A pre-1.0 CPython user, he was among the group of early adopters who contributed to the detailed design of the language in its early stages.

He later created the Timsort algorithm (based on earlier work on the use of "galloping" search) which is used in Python since version 2.3 (since version 3.11 using the Powersort merge policy instead of Timsort's original merge policy), as well as in other widely used computing platforms, including the V8 JavaScript engine powering the Google Chrome and Chromium web browsers, as well as Node.js. According to Vincent Jugé the high performance of Timsort, with its hybrid approach, on real-world data contributed to a revival of interest in the study of sorting algorithms. Peters also contributed the doctest and timeit modules to the Python standard library.

Peters also wrote the Zen of Python, intended as a statement of Python's design philosophy, which was incorporated into the official Python literature as Python Enhancement Proposal 20 and in the Python interpreter as an easter egg. He contributed the chapter on algorithms to the Python Cookbook. From 2001 to 2014 he was active as a member of the Python Software Foundation's board of directors. Peters was an influential contributor to Python mailing lists. He was also a highly ranked contributor to Stack Overflow, mostly for answers relating to Python.

In 2002-3, inspired by Paul Graham's "A Plan for Spam" essay, Gary Robinson and Peters created SpamBayes, one of a number of Bayesian spam filter programs to successfully address the early-2000s email spam crisis.

Peters' employers included Cray Research, Kendall Square Research, Dragon Systems, BeOpen and Zope Corporation. Tim Peters was granted the Python Software Foundation's Distinguished Service Award for 2017.

== See also ==
- History of Python
