= Gary Robinson =

American software engineer and mathematician

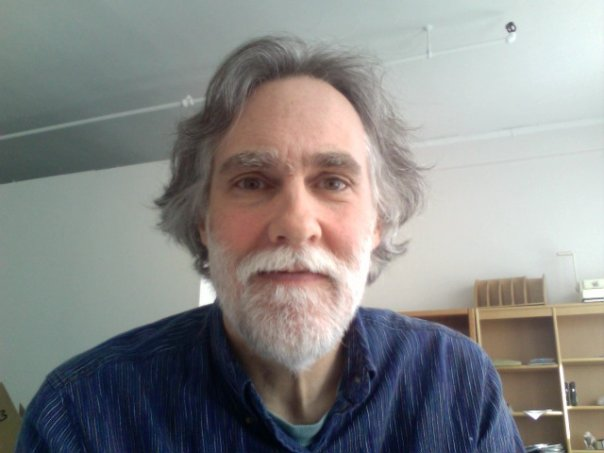
- Born: February 6, 1956 (age 70); Bronxville, NY, US
- Education: Bard College;Courant Institute
- Occupation: Computer programmer
- Employer: Emergent Music LLC
- Known for: SpamBayes, SpamAssassin, Recommendation engine, Collaborative filtering
- Title: Chief Technology officer
- Website: GaryRobinson.net

Gary Robinson is an American software engineer and mathematician and inventor notable for his mathematical algorithms to fight spam. In addition, he patented a method to use web browser cookies to track consumers across different web sites, allowing marketers to better match advertisements with consumers. The patent was bought by DoubleClick, and then DoubleClick was bought by Google. He is credited as being one of the first to use automated collaborative filtering technologies to turn word-of-mouth recommendations into useful data.

== Algorithms to identify spam ==
In 2003, Robinson's article in Linux Journal detailed a new approach to computer programming perhaps best described as a general purpose classifier which expanded on the usefulness of Bayesian filtering. Robinson's method used math-intensive algorithms combined with Chi-square statistical testing to enable computers to examine an unknown file and make intelligent guesses about what was in it. The technique had wide applicability; for example, Robinson's method enabled computers to examine a file and guess, with much greater accuracy, whether it contained pornography, or whether an incoming email to a corporation was a technical question or a sales-related question. The method became the basis for anti-spam techniques used by Tim Peters and Rob Hooft of the influential SpamBayes project. Spamming is the abuse of electronic messaging systems to send unsolicited, undesired bulk messages. SpamBayes assigned probability scores to both spam and ham (useful emails) to guess intelligently whether an incoming email was spam; the scoring system enabled the program to return a value of unsure if both the spam and ham scores were high. Robinson's method was used in other anti-spam projects such as SpamAssassin. Robinson commented in Linux Journal on how fighting spam was a collaborative effort:

The approach described here truly has been a distributed effort in the best open-source tradition. Paul Graham, an author of books on Lisp, suggested an approach to filtering spam in his on-line article, "A Plan for Spam". I took his approach for generating probabilities associated with words, altered it slightly and proposed a Bayesian calculation for dealing with words that hadn't appeared very often ... an approach based on the chi-square distribution for combining the individual word probabilities into a combined probability (actually a pair of probabilities—see below) representing an e-mail. Finally, Tim Peters of the Spambayes Project proposed a way of generating a particularly useful spamminess indicator based on the combined probabilities. All along the way the work was guided by ongoing testing of embodiments written in Python by Tim Peters for Spambayes and in C by Greg Louis of the Bogofilter Project. The testing was done by a number of people involved with those projects.

— Gary Robinson, 2003.

In 1996, Robinson patented a method to help marketers focus their online advertisements to consumers. He explained:

As far as I have been able to tell, it's the very first patent ... to mention using web browser cookies to track consumers across different web sites and build a profile of their interests in order to determine what ads to show them ... There was an aspect in the way browser cookies were implemented that allowed them to be used ... I hired programmers to do the programming to actually test it ... the hypothesis turned out to be correct.

— Gary B. Robinson, 2014

== Entrepreneurial activity ==
In 2010, Robinson was the chief technology officer at FlyFi, an online music service owned by Maine-based Emergent Discovery which uses his anti-spam programming techniques along with collaborative filtering technologies to help make music recommendations to web users. His blog Gary Robinson's Rants has been quoted by others in the computer and online music industries and cited by academic papers. Robinson helped develop recommendation engine technology which applies high-power mathematical techniques using software algorithms to have a computer guess intelligently about what a consumer might like. For example, if a consumer likes music by artists such as the Beach Boys, Bob Dylan and Talking Heads, the computer software will match these preferences with a much larger dataset of other consumers who also like those three artists but which cumulatively has much greater musical knowledge than the single consumer. Accordingly, the computer will find music that the user might like but hasn't been exposed to, and therefore hopefully offer intelligent recommendations, in a process which has come to be called knowledge management. But the mathematics behind such comparisons can become quite complex and involved. Robinson studied mathematics at Bard College and graduated in 1979 and studied further at the Courant Institute of New York University. In the 1980s, Robinson worked on an entrepreneurial start-up dating service called 212-Romance which used similar computer algorithms to match singles romantically. The New York City-based voice mail dating service created community-based automated recommendations and used collaborative filtering technologies which Robinson developed further in other capacities.
