= Hash filter =

A hash filter creates a hash sum from data, typically e-mail, and compares the sum against other previously defined sums. Depending on the purpose of the filter, the data can then be included or excluded in a function based on whether it matches an existing sum.

For example, when a message is received by an e-mail server with a hash filter, the contents of the e-mail are converted into a hash sum. If this sum corresponds to the hash sum of another e-mail which has been categorized as spam, the received e-mail is prevented from being delivered. Spammers attempt to evade this by adding random strings to the text content and random pixel changes ("confetti") to image content (see image spam).

== See also ==
- Bloom filter
- Hash buster
- Locality-sensitive hashing
