= MovieCode =

Website

Source Code in TV and Films
- Website type: Geek
- Owner: John Graham-Cumming
- Website: moviecode.tumblr.com
- Launched: January 3, 2014; 12 years ago
- Current status: Online

MovieCode (full title Source Code in TV and Films) is a website revealing the meanings of computer program source code depicted in film, established in January 2014.

It runs via microblogging site Tumblr, with its owner accepting examples submitted by readers. Its contents include examples of code and their origins and/or meanings.

== History ==
The site was launched on 3 January 2014 via microblogging service Tumblr. It was conceived by programmer and writer John Graham-Cumming to address questions around what the source code seen in films actually does.

Graham-Cumming was inspired to create the blog by Neill Blomkamp's 2013 film Elysium, which uses an extract from an Intel manual. He posted a comparison image related to the film on Twitter, which prompted more than 500 retweets. He then created the blog. The site's full title of Source Code in TV and Films is sometimes shortened to MovieCode, that being the Tumblr subdomain.

A companion website, Behind The Screens, covers some of the entries on MovieCode in great detail in the form of short videos.

== Features ==
Terminator HUD with 6502 assembly language

The site's intention is to connect screenshots to specific extracts of original code. The author accepts examples submitted by readers for future publication.

== Reception ==
The site was reported by the BBC as having received more than 10,000 hits 10 days after its launch.

The German edition of Engadget was noted for its web site's HTML code being used in Duane Clark's 2011 TV series XIII, while it was noted elsewhere that movie code is frequently taken from web sites, including Wikipedia and a Canadian bank.

It was noted that instead of using "random code" (which is often the case) sometimes more appropriate code is used. Some cited examples are James Cameron's 1984 film The Terminator (using assembly language for the 1975 MOS 6502 microprocessor), Eric Kripke's 2012 TV series Revolution (using code from Jordan Mechner's 1989 video game Prince of Persia) and David Fincher's 2011 film The Girl with the Dragon Tattoo (using MySQL).

== See also ==
- Starring the Computer
