= Hash buster =

Program that changes data's hash sum

A hash buster is a program which randomly adds characters to data in order to change the data's hash sum.

This is typically used to add words to spam e-mails, to bypass hash filters. As the e-mail's hash sum is different from the sum of e-mails previously defined as spam, the e-mail is not considered spam and therefore delivered as if it were a normal message.

Hash busters can also be used to randomly add content to any kind of file until the hash sum becomes a certain sum. In e-mail context, this could be used to bypass a filter which only accepts e-mails with a certain sum.

Initially spams containing "white noise" from hash busters tended to simply exhibit 'paragraphs' of literally random words, but increasingly these are now appearing somewhat grammatical.

== See also ==
- Cryptographic hash function
- Bayesian poisoning
- Locality-sensitive hashing
