= Starring the Computer =

Website on computers in film and television

- Available in: English
- Founded: 2008
- Creator: James Carter

"Starring the Computer" is a website that catalogs computer models that have appeared in movies. The website was started in 2008 by James Carter, a system administrator from York, England. According to the website, the computers that are most featured in movies are the IBM AN/FSQ-7, Commodore 64, Apple II and the Burroughs B205.

The website rates scenes out of five stars on importance to the plot, realism (how real it is) and visibility (how much you can see).

== See also ==
- MovieCode
