= John Graham-Cumming =

British software engineer and writer

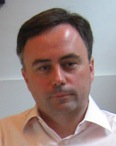
- John Graham-Cumming in 2010
- Education: University of Oxford (DPhil)
- Known for: POPFile; The Geek Atlas
- Scientific career
- Workplaces: Cloudflare (Board of Directors); Cloudflare (Former CTO); Electric Cloud
- Thesis: The formal development of secure systems (1992)
- Doctoral advisor: Jeff W. Sanders
- Website: www.jgc.org

John Graham-Cumming is a British software engineer and writer best known for starting a successful petition to the Government of the United Kingdom asking for an apology for its persecution of Alan Turing. UK Prime Minister Gordon Brown issued the apology in September 2009.As of 2025, Graham-Cumming is a member of the Board of Directors at Cloudflare, where he previously served as the company's Chief Technology Officer until March 2025. Prior to joining Cloudflare, he co-founded Electric Cloud.

== Education ==
Graham-Cumming was educated at the University of Oxford obtaining a BA in Mathematics and Computation and a Doctor of Philosophy degree in Computer Science in 1992 for research on formal methods for secure computing systems supervised by Jeff W. Sanders. He was an undergraduate and graduate student at Lady Margaret Hall, Oxford.

== Career ==
Graham-Cumming is the original writer of POPFile, an open-source, cross-platform, machine learning email spam filtering program. He is the author of The Geek Atlas, a travel book, and The GNU Make book, a how-to technical manual for the GNU make software. He also wrote and maintained a library of functions for GNU Make called the GNU Make Standard Library.

In October 2010, he started an organization whose aim is to build Charles Babbage's Analytical Engine, known as Plan 28. He has also campaigned for open-source software in science. In 2014, he launched the MovieCode site on Tumblr, which aims to connect film screenshots to specific extracts of source code. Some of the films and source code covered on the MovieCode website are explored in depth in the form of videos on his site Behind The Screens.
